

9001–9100 

|-
| 9001 Slettebak ||  || Arne Slettebak (1925–1999) was for 16 years chair of the department of astronomy of Ohio State University.  || 
|-id=002
| 9002 Gabrynowicz ||  || Joanne Irene Gabrynowicz (1949) is Emerita Professor, Director of the National Center for Remote Sensing, Air, and Space Law of the University of Mississippi School of Law, and Editor-in-Chief of the Journal of Space Law.  || 
|-id=003
| 9003 Ralphmilliken ||  || Ralph E. Milliken (born 1978), a planetary science professor at Brown University. || 
|-id=004
| 9004 Peekaydee ||  || Philip K. Dick (1928–1982), an American science fiction author. || 
|-id=005
| 9005 Sidorova ||  || Sophia Ivanovna Sidorova (born 1943), public education worker in Ukraine and leader of the Crimean Republic Committee for the education of workers. || 
|-id=006
| 9006 Voytkevych ||  || Vanda Georgievna Voytkevych (born 1949), friend of astronomer Lyudmila Karachkina who discovered this asteroid || 
|-id=007
| 9007 James Bond ||  || James Bond, "agent 007", fictional British spy || 
|-id=008
| 9008 Bohšternberk || 1984 BS || Bohumil Šternberk (1897–1983), Czech astronomer || 
|-id=009
| 9009 Tirso ||  || Thyrsus (Tirso), the scepter of Dionysus; Italian acronym of the Circolo eno-g-astronomico TIRSO (for "all together enjoying, studying, observing"), a scientific and cultural circle || 
|-id=010
| 9010 Candelo ||  || Candelo, Italy, a small town in northern Piedmont || 
|-id=011
| 9011 Angelou || 1984 SU || Maya Angelou (1928–2014), born Marguerite Annie Johnson, an American poet, author, and civil rights activist || 
|-id=012
| 9012 Benner || 1984 UW || Lance A. M. Benner (born 1964), an American radio astronomer at the Jet Propulsion Laboratory (Src). || 
|-id=013
| 9013 Sansaturio ||  || Maria Eugenia Sansaturio (born 1959), a mathematician at the University of Valladolid. || 
|-id=014
| 9014 Svyatorichter ||  || Svyatoslav Richter (1915–1997), Russian pianist and People's artist of the U.S.S.R. || 
|-id=015
| 9015 Coe || 1985 VK || Malcolm Coe (born 1949) is Professor of Astronomy at the University of Southampton in the U.K.  || 
|-id=016
| 9016 Henrymoore || 1986 AE || Henry J. Moore (1928–1998), a geologist with the U.S. Geological Survey since 1960. || 
|-id=017
| 9017 Babadzhanyan ||  || Arno Babajanian (1921–1983), a Soviet composer and pianist. || 
|-id=018
| 9018 Galache || 1987 JG || José Luis Galache (born 1975) has worked at the Minor Planet Center (MPC) since 2009. || 
|-id=019
| 9019 Eucommia ||  || Eucommiaceae, a family with only one member, the elmlike Eucommia ulmoides, a vigorous and decorative plant. It is the only tree from temperate regions that produces latex in small quantities. || 
|-id=020
| 9020 Eucryphia ||  || Eucryphiaceae, a family with five species in a single genus. Eucryphia cordifolia (Chilean elm) may reach a height of 12 m. Hybrids between the different species are cultivated for the garden. || 
|-id=021
| 9021 Fagus ||  || Fagaceae, the beech family, with eight genera and over 1000 species, including oaks and chestnuts. Well-known species are Fagus grandifolia (American beech) and Fagus sylvatica (European beech). || 
|-id=022
| 9022 Drake ||  || Michael J. Drake (born 1946), American cosmochemist and geochemist || 
|-id=023
| 9023 Mnesthus ||  || Mnestheus from Greek mythology.  || 
|-id=024
| 9024 Gunnargraps ||  || Gunnar Graps (1951–2004) || 
|-id=025
| 9025 Polanskey ||  || Carol A. Polanskey (born 1960), a science operations expert at the Jet Propulsion Laboratory. || 
|-id=026
| 9026 Denevi ||  || Brett W. Denevi (born 1980), a planetary scientist at the Johns Hopkins University Applied Physics Laboratory and an expert in the composition and evolution of asteroid surfaces. || 
|-id=027
| 9027 Graps ||  || Amara Graps (born 1961) is a planetary scientist. || 
|-id=028
| 9028 Konrádbeneš ||  || Konrád Beneš (1920–1999), Czech planetologist || 
|-id=030
| 9030 Othryoneus ||  || Othryoneus, from Greek mythology, who had taken part in the Trojan War in exchange for being allowed to marry Cassandra, King Priam's daughter. He was killed by Idomeneus during the Battle of the Ships. || 
|-id=032
| 9032 Tanakami ||  || Tanakami, extending over Shiga, Mie and Kyoto prefectures, is the site of the largest meteorite found in Japan. || 
|-id=033
| 9033 Kawane || 1990 AD || Kawane, a small town about 230 km west of Tokyo. || 
|-id=034
| 9034 Oleyuria ||  || Oleyuria, Ukrainian piano duo of Olga Scherbakova and Yuri Scherbakov. || 
|-id=038
| 9038 Helensteel ||  || Helen Margaret Steel (born 1959), wife of discoverer Duncan Steel || 
|-id=040
| 9040 Flacourtia ||  || Flacourtiaceae, the Indian plum family, with almost 90 genera and 900 species. Flacourtia indica (governor's plum) is one of the species, and the southeast Asian genus Hydnocarpus produces an oil that is used for treating some skin diseases. || 
|-id=041
| 9041 Takane || 1991 CX || Takane, name of the town in which the Otomo observatory is located. || 
|-id=044
| 9044 Kaoru || 1991 KA || Kaoru Ikeya (born 1964), lecturer and curator of the Gotoh Planetarium and Astronomical Museum in Tokyo. || 
|-id=052
| 9052 Uhland ||  || Johann Ludwig Uhland (1787–1862), a German poet. || 
|-id=053
| 9053 Hamamelis ||  || Hamamelidaceae, the witch-hazel family, with about 25 genera and 100 species, typical in South America and Africa. Hamamelis virginiana (witch hazel) is not a true hazel, although the leaves are similar. || 
|-id=054
| 9054 Hippocastanum || 1991 YO || Hippocastanaceae, the horse-chestnut family, with only two genera and 15 species. Aesculus hippocastanum (common horse-chestnut) is known for its creamy yellow flowers, in large, conical, upright panicles. || 
|-id=055
| 9055 Edvardsson ||  || Bengt Edvardsson (born 1956), Swedish astronomer || 
|-id=056
| 9056 Piskunov ||  || Nikolai Piskunov (born 1957), Swedish astrophysicist || 
|-id=059
| 9059 Dumas || 1992 PJ || Alexandre Dumas (1802–1870), the grandson of a French marquis and the son of a French general in Napoleon's army, a very well known writer. || 
|-id=060
| 9060 Toyokawa || 1992 RM || Hideji Toyokawa (1926–1995), a curator of the Gotoh Planetarium and Astronomical Museum in Tokyo. || 
|-id=062
| 9062 Ohnishi ||  || Michikazu Ohnishi (born 1933) is a chemical plant engineer and lecturer in descriptive geometry. || 
|-id=063
| 9063 Washi || 1992 YS || Shinsho Washi (born 1951), the director of the Sakai City Planetarium. || 
|-id=064
| 9064 Johndavies ||  || John Keith Davies (born 1955), British astronomer/aviation engineer † || 
|-id=067
| 9067 Katsuno || 1993 HR || Gentaro Katsuno (born 1933), chief editor of Gekkan Tenmon Guide ("Monthly Astronomy Guide") from 1975 to 1987 || 
|-id=069
| 9069 Hovland || 1993 OV || Larry E. Hovland (born 1947), a senior engineer at the Jet Propulsion Laboratory. || 
|-id=070
| 9070 Ensab ||  || Leo Enright (born 1943) and Denise Sabatini (born 1950), Canadian astronomers || 
|-id=071
| 9071 Coudenberghe ||  || Peeter van Coudenberghe (1520–1594), Flemish botanist and pharmacist || 
|-id=073
| 9073 Yoshinori || 1994 ER || Yoshinori Kobayashi (born 1929), a professor emeritus at Hiroshima University and professor at Tokushima Bunri University. || 
|-id=074
| 9074 Yosukeyoshida || 1994 FZ || Yosuke Yoshida (born 1945), chief editor of Gekkan Tenmon Guide ("Monthly Astronomy Guide") from 1988 to 1993. || 
|-id=076
| 9076 Shinsaku || 1994 JT || Shinsaku Takasugi (1839–1867) || 
|-id=077
| 9077 Ildo || 1994 NC || Ildo Lombardi (1934–1954), Italian gymnast and brother of Giuseppe Lombardi, a member of a team of amateur astronomers. || 
|-id=079
| 9079 Gesner ||  || Conrad Gessner (1516–1565), a versatile Swiss naturalist and bibliographer || 
|-id=080
| 9080 Takayanagi || 1994 TP || Yuichi Takayanagi (born 1939) || 
|-id=081
| 9081 Hideakianno || 1994 VY || Hideaki Anno (born 1960), a Japanese animator and director. || 
|-id=082
| 9082 Leonardmartin ||  || Leonard J. Martin, planetary astronomer and cartographer at the Lowell Observatory. || 
|-id=083
| 9083 Ramboehm ||  || Jeff Ramos (born 1962) and Art Boehm (born 1944), friends of the discoverers Carolyn Shoemaker and David H. Levy. || 
|-id=084
| 9084 Achristou ||  || Apostolos Christou (born 1968), Planetary astronomer at the Irish Armagh Observatory || 
|-id=087
| 9087 Neff ||  || Vladimír Neff (1909–1983), Czech novelist and his son Ondřej Neff (born 1945), science fiction author || 
|-id=088
| 9088 Maki ||  || Fusao Maki (1916–2001), a songwriter who wrote many children's songs, school songs, home songs, and citizen's songs, and left hundreds of works. || 
|-id=090
| 9090 Chirotenmondai ||  || Chiro Astronomical Observatory  or Chiro tenmondai in Western Australia. It was founded by Australian and Japanese amateur astronomers in 1995. || 
|-id=091
| 9091 Ishidatakaki || 1995 VK || Takaki Ishida (born 1948), principal of Sanyo Girls' High and Junior High School in Hatsukaichi City, Hiroshima Prefecture. || 
|-id=092
| 9092 Nanyang ||  || Nanyang City, in the southwest of Henan Province || 
|-id=093
| 9093 Sorada || 1995 WA || Toshiyuki Sorada (born 1954), an amateur astronomer in Hiroshima City. || 
|-id=094
| 9094 Butsuen || 1995 WH || Kazunari Butsuen (born 1952), an amateur astronomer in Kure City, Hiroshima Prefecture. || 
|-id=096
| 9096 Tamotsu ||  || Tamotsu Fujii (born 1947), a member of the Oriental Astronomical Association since 1960 and president of the Yamashiro Astronomical Association since its founding in 1962. || 
|-id=097
| 9097 Davidschlag ||  || Davidschlag, Upper Austria, small Austrian village, some 10 km to the north of Linz, at the entrance to the Sterngartl ("small garden of stars") region, home of the Privatobservatorium Meyer/Obermair (Private Observatory Meyer/Obermair) † || 
|-id=098
| 9098 Toshihiko ||  || Toshihiko Osawa (1935–2001) || 
|-id=099
| 9099 Kenjitanabe ||  || Kenji Tanabe (born 1944), a professor at Okayama University of Science. || 
|-id=100
| 9100 Tomohisa ||  || Tomohisa Ohno (born 1948), a Japanese amateur astronomer. || 
|}

9101–9200 

|-
| 9101 Rossiglione ||  || Rossiglione. || 
|-id=102
| 9102 Foglar ||  || Jaroslav Foglar (1907–1999), Czech children's author || 
|-id=103
| 9103 Komatsubara ||  || Mitsugu Komatsubara (born 1953), a Japanese reporter and amateur astronomer. || 
|-id=104
| 9104 Matsuo || 1996 YB || Atsushi Matsuo (born 1955), Japanese astronomy educator and historian || 
|-id=105
| 9105 Matsumura || 1997 AU || Masafumi Matsumura (born 1955), Japanese astronomer || 
|-id=106
| 9106 Yatagarasu ||  || Yatagarasu, the holy crow with three legs of Japanese mythology, who guided Jinmu, the so-called first emperor, and his troops from Kumano to Nara (The Chinese counterpart of the crow with three legs is said to live in the Sun, and could be a naked-eye sunspot) || 
|-id=107
| 9107 Narukospa ||  || Naruko, Miyagi (Naruko Onsen)  || 
|-id=108
| 9108 Toruyusa ||  || Toru Yusa (born 1966) is director of the planetarium and observatory at the Osaki Lifelong Learning Center in Miyagi Prefecture and a member of the board of directors of the Japan Public Observatory Society. || 
|-id=109
| 9109 Yukomotizuki ||  || Yuko Motizuki (born 1965) is an associate professor at Saitama University. Her speciality is the theoretical study of nucleosynthesis, supernovae and neutron stars. She is also leading a team to examine the effects of solar cycles and supernovae on Antarctic ice cores || 
|-id=110
| 9110 Choukai ||  || Mount Choukai (2230 m) and the Choukai volcanic mountain range, Japan, national park and part of the border between Akita and Yamagata prefectures || 
|-id=111
| 9111 Matarazzo ||  || Giuseppe "Corrado" Matarazzo (born 1946), Italian mathematician from Sicily, amateur astronomer and orbit computer. In 1995 he co-authored Elementi di Calcolo delle Orbite. || 
|-id=112
| 9112 Hatsulars ||  || Hatsulars is the name of a women's chorus. Its members are mainly housewives of farming families of Kakegawa City. || 
|-id=114
| 9114 Hatakeyama ||  || Hideo Hatakeyama (born 1955) || 
|-id=115
| 9115 Battisti || 1997 DG || Lucio Battisti (1943–1998), Italian singer (Src) || 
|-id=116
| 9116 Billhamilton ||  || William O. Hamilton (born 1933), American professor of physics and astronomy at Louisiana State University. (Src) || 
|-id=117
| 9117 Aude ||  || AUDÉ, the Association des utilisateurs de détecteurs électroniques; users of electronic detectors association || 
|-id=119
| 9119 Georgpeuerbach || 1998 DT || Georg von Peuerbach (1423–1461), Austrian mathematician, astronomer, poet, early humanist and teacher of Regiomontanus || 
|-id=121
| 9121 Stefanovalentini ||  || Stefano Valentini (born 1955), Italian amateur astronomer, software developer and creator of WinAstrometry || 
|-id=122
| 9122 Hunten ||  || Donald M. Hunten (1925–2010), American astronomer, who has participated in space missions from Pioneer to Cassini || 
|-id=123
| 9123 Yoshiko ||  || Yoshiko Nakano (born 1933), Japanese director of the Gekko Observatory and educator || 
|-id=126
| 9126 Samcoulson ||  || Samuel Harold Coulson (born 1998) is a finalist in the 2012 Broadcom MASTERS, a math and science competition for middle-school students, for his earth and space sciences project || 
|-id=127
| 9127 Brucekoehn ||  || Bruce W. Koehn (born 1948), American astronomer and software developer. His software has been used by the LONEOS program. || 
|-id=128
| 9128 Takatumuzi ||  || Mount Takatumuzi (693 m), Japan, east of Nanyo city, Yamagata prefecture, where the discovery site is located || 
|-id=130
| 9130 Galois ||  || Évariste Galois (1811–1832), French mathematician and contributor to group theory || 
|-id=132
| 9132 Walteranderson || 2821 P-L || Walter Anderson (born 1953), chief executive officer of Entreé International || 
|-id=133
| 9133 d'Arrest || 3107 P-L || Heinrich Louis d'Arrest (1822–1875), a German astronomer || 
|-id=134
| 9134 Encke || 4822 P-L || Johann Franz Encke (1791–1865), an eminent German astronomer || 
|-id=135
| 9135 Lacaille || 7609 P-L || Nicolas Louis de Lacaille (1713–1762), a French astronomer || 
|-id=136
| 9136 Lalande || 4886 T-1 || Jérôme Lalande (1732–1807), a French astronomer || 
|-id=137
| 9137 Remo || 2114 T-2 || John L. Remo (born 1941), American physicist || 
|-id=138
| 9138 Murdoch || 2280 T-2 || Jean Iris Murdoch (1919–1999), a prolific novelist and philosopher || 
|-id=139
| 9139 Barrylasker || 4180 T-2 || Barry Lasker (1939–1999), American astronomer || 
|-id=140
| 9140 Deni || 4195 T-3 || the Department of Education for Northern Ireland (Deni), for its support of the Armagh Observatory || 
|-id=141
| 9141 Kapur || 5174 T-3 || Shekhar Kapur (born 1945), Indian actor || 
|-id=142
| 9142 Rhesus || 5191 T-3 || Rhesus of Thrace, the king of the Thracians and ally of the Trojans || 
|-id=143
| 9143 Burkhead || 1955 SF || Martin S. Burkhead (born 1933), an emeritus professor at Indiana University || 
|-id=144
| 9144 Hollisjohnson ||  || Hollis R. Johnson (born 1928), an emeritus professor at Indiana University || 
|-id=145
| 9145 Shustov ||  || Boris Mikhailovich Shustov (born 1947), a deputy director at the Institute of Astronomy of the Russian Academy of Sciences || 
|-id=146
| 9146 Tulikov ||  || Sergeevich Tulikov (born 1914), a composer and an artist in the U.S.S.R. || 
|-id=147
| 9147 Kourakuen ||  || Kourakuen in Okayama is one of the three most outstanding gardens in Japan || 
|-id=148
| 9148 Boriszaitsev ||  || Boris Petrovich Zaitsev (1925–2000), People's artist of Ukraine || 
|-id=150
| 9150 Zavolokin ||  || Gennadij Dmitrievich Zavolokin (1943–2001), a player of the bayan (Russian accordion) || 
|-id=151
| 9151 Kettnergriswold ||  || Kettner John Frederick Griswold (born 1960) is the "Launch Vehicle Integration Manager" of the Lucy mission. || 
|-id=152
| 9152 Combe ||  || Jean-Philippe Combe (born 1977), a research scientist on the Dawn mission team analyzing the mineralogy of Vesta using visible and near-infrared mapping data || 
|-id=153
| 9153 Chikurinji ||  || Chikurinji is the mountain on which the Okayama Astrophysical Observatory is situated. || 
|-id=154
| 9154 Kolʹtsovo ||  || Kolʹtsovo, a suburb of Novosibirsk, is the site of the State Scientific Institute of Virology and Biotechnology of the Russian Ministry of Public Health || 
|-id=155
| 9155 Verkhodanov ||  || Vyacheslav Gennadievich Verkhodanov (born 1942), a Ukrainian economics and management specialist || 
|-id=156
| 9156 Malanin ||  || Ivan Ivanovich Malanin (1897–1969), Russian accordionist || 
|-id=158
| 9158 Platè || 1984 MR || Nikolaj Alfredovich Platè (born 1934), a chief scientific secretary of the Russian Academy of Sciences and director of the Institute of Petrochemical Synthesis in Moscow || 
|-id=159
| 9159 McDonnell ||  || J. A. M. ("Tony") McDonnell (born 1938) || 
|-id=161
| 9161 Beaufort ||  || Rear Admiral Sir Francis Beaufort (1774–1857), an admiral of the British Navy who devised the scale for classifying wind force at sea || 
|-id=162
| 9162 Kwiila || 1987 OA || Kwiila ("Black Oak"), one of the First People in the Luiseno creation story (the black oak is indigenous to Palomar Mountain, the discovery site) || 
|-id=164
| 9164 Colbert || 1987 SQ || Edwin H. Colbert (born 1905), a U.S. vertebrate paleontologist || 
|-id=165
| 9165 Raup ||  || David M. Raup (1933–2015), paleontologist and biological historian at the University of Chicago. || 
|-id=167
| 9167 Kharkiv ||  || Kharkiv (Kharkov) || 
|-id=168
| 9168 Sarov ||  || Sarov, a small town in the Nizhnij Novgorod region of the Russian Federation where the All-Russian Research Institute of Experimental Physics is located || 
|-id=171
| 9171 Carolyndiane ||  || Carolyn Diane Young (born 1940) || 
|-id=172
| 9172 Abhramu || 1989 OB || Abhramu, the "cloud-knitter", was the original female elephant who was a supernatural winged being who could change her shape at will, like the clouds that resemble her children. According to Indian legend, Abhramu's tribe lost its wings and magic by mischance. || 
|-id=173
| 9173 Viola Castello ||  || Viola Castello in Piedmont, northern Italy. || 
|-id=175
| 9175 Graun ||  || Ken Graun (born 1955) || 
|-id=176
| 9176 Struchkova ||  || Raisa Stepanovna Struchkova (born 1925), a Russian ballerina at the Moscow Bolshoi Theatre since 1944 || 
|-id=177
| 9177 Donsaari ||  || Donald G. Saari (born 1940), an American mathematician. || 
|-id=178
| 9178 Momoyo || 1991 DU || Momoyo Urata, the wife of Japanese co-discoverer Takeshi Urata || 
|-id=179
| 9179 Satchmo ||  || Louis Armstrong (1901–1971), American jazz musician || 
|-id=180
| 9180 Samsagan || 1991 GQ || Samuel Democritus Druyan Sagan (born 1991), the son of Carl Sagan and Ann Druyan || 
|-id=184
| 9184 Vasilij ||  || Vasilij Rumyantsev (born 1968), a Russian astronomer || 
|-id=186
| 9186 Fumikotsukimoto ||  || Fumiko Tsukimoto (born 1987), a painter and illustrator|| 
|-id=187
| 9187 Walterkröll ||  || Walter Kröll (born), German physicist || 
|-id=189
| 9189 Hölderlin ||  || Friedrich Hölderlin (1770–1843), German poet || 
|-id=190
| 9190 Masako ||  || Masako Muramatsu, wife of Japanese co-discoverer Osamu Muramatsu || 
|-id=191
| 9191 Hokuto || 1991 XU || Hokuto-shi is the largest city in Yamanashi-ken in Japan. || 
|-id=193
| 9193 Geoffreycopland ||  || Geoffrey Malcolm Copland, British physicist || 
|-id=194
| 9194 Ananoff ||  || Alexandre Ananoff (1910–1992) was a Russian-French space expert, author of L´Astronautique (1950) and organizer of the first International Astronautical Congress. In 1950 he was the first recipient of the Hermann Oberth Medal, and he was an advisor on fellow writer Hergé's Adventures of Tintin on the Moon || 
|-id=196
| 9196 Sukagawa ||  || Sukagawa, Fukushima, Japan || 
|-id=197
| 9197 Endo ||  || Shu Endo (born 1953), one of Japan's leading astrophotographers || 
|-id=198
| 9198 Sasagamine ||  || Sasagamine, mountain in Shikoku, Japan || 
|}

9201–9300 

|-id=203
| 9203 Myrtus ||  || Myrtaceae, the myrtle family of aromatic trees and shrubs, with more than 100 genera and nearly 4000 species. This family is typical of the Southern Hemisphere, where the Eucalyptus genus is prevalent. Myrtus communis (common myrtle) is a species native to the Mediterranean and is cultivated as far north as England. || 
|-id=204
| 9204 Mörike ||  || Eduard Mörike (1804–1875), German Romantic poet || 
|-id=205
| 9205 Eddywally ||  || Eddy Wally (born 1930), a Flemish singer || 
|-id=206
| 9206 Yanaikeizo || 1994 RQ || Keizo Yanai (born 1941), once of researchers at the Japanese National Institute of Polar Research || 
|-id=207
| 9207 Petersmith ||  || Peter H. Smith (born 1947), planetary scientist at the Lunar and Planetary Laboratory || 
|-id=208
| 9208 Takanotoshi ||  || Toshiaki Takano (born 1954), an associate professor at Chiba University Graduate School of Science and Technology || 
|-id=211
| 9211 Neese ||  || Carol Lynn Neese (born 1958), American astronomer at Planetary Science Institute who worked on the JPL Small-Body Database || 
|-id=212
| 9212 Kanamaru ||  || Naomiki Kanamaru (born 1970) is an amateur astronomer. || 
|-id=215
| 9215 Taiyonoto ||  || The famous monument Taiyonoto, "Tower of the Sun", is in Suita City || 
|-id=216
| 9216 Masuzawa || 1995 VS || Hitoshi Masuzawa (born 1945), a lecturer and curator of the Gotoh Planetarium and Astronomical Museum in Tokyo || 
|-id=217
| 9217 Kitagawa || 1995 WN || Ryuji Kitagawa (1949–2009) was a professor at Hiroshima University. From his research of clay mineralogy, he clarified the mechanism of weathering of granite and generation of landslide and slope failure. || 
|-id=218
| 9218 Ishiikazuo ||  || Kazuo Ishii (born 1950), employed in the past in the manufacture of planetaria, has been working since 2005 as an architectural consultant in the design of astronomical facilities. (Ikeya-Seki) || 
|-id=220
| 9220 Yoshidayama ||  || Yoshidayama is a hill located in Sakyo, a district in the northeastern part of Kyoto. It contains temples, shrines, and many maple trees. || 
|-id=221
| 9221 Wuliangyong ||  || Wu Liangyong (born 1922) is an architect, city planner, and educator, and the founder of Sciences of Human Settlements in China || 
|-id=222
| 9222 Chubey || 1995 YM || Markiyan S. Chubey (born 1940) is a Ukrainian-born Russian scientist working at the Pulkovo Observatory. He is an astrometrist and is leading a team to develop astrometry and astrophysics at the sun-earth L4 and L5 points using the stereo principle || 
|-id=223
| 9223 Leifandersson ||  || Leif Erland Andersson (1943–1979) observed that most satellites of the outer planets rotate synchronously about their parent planets, helped determine Pluto's pole position and albedo map, and determined that Pluto and its satellite Charon would display mutual transits and eclipses. He also made a catalogue of lunar craters. || 
|-id=224
| 9224 Železný || 1996 AE || Jan Železný, Czech javelin thrower || 
|-id=225
| 9225 Daiki || 1996 AU || Daiki Matsubayashi (born 1961) has been a member of the Saga Astronomical Society since the time of its establishment in 1981. || 
|-id=226
| 9226 Arimahiroshi ||  || Hiroshi Arima (born 1958) is a registered architect who also designs individual observatories in Japan. While a university student he was a leader of the Kyushu Meteoric Network. With members of the Kumamoto Civil Astronomical Observatory, he helped carry out a solar eclipse observation in Mexico in 1991 || 
|-id=227
| 9227 Ashida ||  || Masafumi Ashida (born 1957) || 
|-id=228
| 9228 Nakahiroshi ||  || Japanese amateur astronomer Hiroshi Nakanishi (born 1936) || 
|-id=229
| 9229 Matsuda ||  || Junichi Matsuda (born 1948), a professor at Osaka University || 
|-id=230
| 9230 Yasuda ||  || Satoshi Yasuda (born 1948), a member of Amateur Radio on the International Space Station-Japan and a professor at Hitotsubashi University || 
|-id=231
| 9231 Shimaken ||  || Shimaken is the research group led by Toshihiko Shimamoto (born 1946), a professor emeritus of Kyoto University. The group reproduced seismogenic fault motion in the laboratory and found that the fault motion itself dramatically weakens the fault by frictional heating and promotes generation of large earthquakes || 
|-id=232
| 9232 Miretti ||  || Manlio Miretti (1928–1996)| 
|-id=233
| 9233 Itagijun ||  || Jun Itagi (born 1958), an amateur astronomical educator famous in the San-In district (Tottori and Shimane prefectures), has served as general-affairs director of the San-In Society of Astronomy.  || 
|-id=234
| 9234 Matsumototaku ||  || Takuya Matsumoto (born 1966) is a high-school teacher and amateur astronomer who has also been director of the 100-member headquarters of the San-In Society of Astronomy since 1990 || 
|-id=235
| 9235 Shimanamikaido ||  || Nishiseto Expressway || 
|-id=236
| 9236 Obermair ||  || Erwin Obermair (1946–2017), Austrian amateur astronomer and discoverer of minor planets || 
|-id=238
| 9238 Yavapai ||  || Yavapai, the county in Arizona of which Prescott is the county seat || 
|-id=239
| 9239 van Riebeeck ||  || Jan van Riebeeck (1619–1677), Dutch merchant and founder of the Cape Colony in South Africa || 
|-id=240
| 9240 Nassau ||  || Jason John Nassau (1893–1965), a director of the Warner and Swasey Observatory and professor at Case Institute of Technology during 1924–1959 || 
|-id=241
| 9241 Rosfranklin ||  || Rosalind Franklin (1920–1958), an English chemist || 
|-id=242
| 9242 Olea ||  || Oleaceae, the olive family, with about 25 genera and nearly 1000 species. Genera include ash, lilac, jasmine and forsythia. Olea europea (common olive) is profitable as a fruit and source of oil || 
|-id=244
| 9244 Višnjan ||  || Višnjan || 
|-id=246
| 9246 Niemeyer ||  || Oscar Niemeyer (born 1907), the chief architect in Brazil || 
|-id=248
| 9248 Sauer || 4593 P-L || Carl G. Sauer Jr., a principal flight mechanics engineer at NASA's Jet Propulsion Laboratory || 
|-id=249
| 9249 Yen || 4606 P-L || Chen-wan L. Yen, a senior analyst within the Mission and Systems Architecture Section of NASA's Jet Propulsion Laboratory. || 
|-id=250
| 9250 Chamberlin || 4643 P-L || Alan B. Chamberlin, a senior engineer within the Navigation and Flight Mechanics Section of NASA's Jet Propulsion Laboratory || 
|-id=251
| 9251 Harch || 4896 P-L || Ann P. Harch, the Cornell University scientist || 
|-id=252
| 9252 Goddard || 9058 P-L || Robert H. Goddard (1882–1945), American rocketry pioneer || 
|-id=253
| 9253 Oberth || 1171 T-1 || Hermann Oberth (1894–1989), Romanian-born German rocketry pioneer || 
|-id=254
| 9254 Shunkai || 2151 T-1 || Shibukawa Shunkai (1639–1715), an expert on the calendar || 
|-id=255
| 9255 Inoutadataka || 3174 T-1 || Inou Tadataka (1745–1818), a Japan geographer and surveyor || 
|-id=256
| 9256 Tsukamoto || 1324 T-2 || Tsukamoto Akitake (1833–1885), a geographer who worked for both the Tokugawa and Meiji governments || 
|-id=257
| 9257 Kunisuke || 1552 T-2 || Kunisuke Kinoshita (1901–1931), an astronomer at the Tokyo Astronomical Observatory from 1924 to his death || 
|-id=258
| 9258 Johnpauljones || 2137 T-2 || John Paul Jones (1747–1792), American Revolutionary War naval hero || 
|-id=259
| 9259 Janvanparadijs || 2189 T-2 || Jan van Paradijs (1946–1999), Dutch astronomer and astrophysicist || 
|-id=260
| 9260 Edwardolson ||  || Edward C. Olson (born 1930), an emeritus professor at the University of Illinois || 
|-id=261
| 9261 Peggythomson ||  || Peggy Y. Thomson (born 1927) || 
|-id=262
| 9262 Bordovitsyna || 1973 RF || Tatiana Valentinovna Bordovitsyna (born 1940), head of the department of celestial mechanics and astrometry in the Institute for Applied Mathematics and Mechanics of Tomsk University || 
|-id=263
| 9263 Khariton ||  || Yulij Borisovich Khariton (born 1904), a physicist and member of the Russian Academy of Sciences || 
|-id=265
| 9265 Ekman ||  || Swedish encyclopaedists Agnita Ekman (born 1945) and Arne Ekman (born 1945) || 
|-id=266
| 9266 Holger ||  || Holger Pedersen (born 1946), Danish astronomer at ESO || 
|-id=267
| 9267 Lokrume ||  || The church in the parish of Lokrume on Gotland island in Sweden || 
|-id=268
| 9268 Jeremihschneider ||  || Jeremih Paul Schneider (born 1981) was responsible for the electrical power subsystem of the Lucy space probe. Lucy's potent photovoltaic array allows it to travel at a greater distance from the Sun than any previous spacecraft did. || 
|-id=269
| 9269 Peterolufemi ||  || Peter Ajiboye Olufemi (born 1960) is the "Chief Safety and Mission Assurance Officer" of the Lucy spacecraft. || 
|-id=270
| 9270 Sherryjennings ||  || Sherry Ann Jennings (born 1962) is the Mission Manager of the Lucy spacecraft at NASA's "Planetary Missions Program" office. || 
|-id=271
| 9271 Trimble ||  || Virginia Louise Trimble (born 1943)  || 
|-id=272
| 9272 Liseleje || 1979 KQ || Liseleje, Zealand, Denmark || 
|-id=273
| 9273 Schloerb ||  || Frederick Peter Schloerb (born 1952), American astronomer || 
|-id=274
| 9274 Amylovell ||  || Amy Jean Lovell (born 1969), American astronomer || 
|-id=275
| 9275 Persson ||  || Jöran Persson (c. 1530–1568), prosecutor and counsellor to King Eric XIV of Sweden || 
|-id=276
| 9276 Timgrove ||  || Timothy L. Grove (born 1949), a professor of geology at the Massachusetts Institute of Technology || 
|-id=277
| 9277 Togashi ||  || Tom Togashi (1937–2000) || 
|-id=279
| 9279 Seager ||  || Sara Seager (born 1971), a Canadian-American astronomer and planetary scientist. She is a professor of physics and planetary science at the Massachusetts Institute of Technology. || 
|-id=280
| 9280 Stevenjoy ||  || Steven P. Joy (born 1960), the Dawn mission science manager at the University of California Los Angeles || 
|-id=281
| 9281 Weryk ||  || Robert J. Weryk (born 1981), a researcher at Mount Allison University in Sackville, New Brunswick || 
|-id=282
| 9282 Lucylim ||  || Lucy F. Lim (born 1977), a planetary scientist at the Goddard Space Flight Center || 
|-id=283
| 9283 Martinelvis ||  || Martin S. Elvis (born 1951), an astrophysicist and expert on quasars at the Harvard-Smithsonian Center for Astrophysics || 
|-id=284
| 9284 Juansanchez ||  || Juan Andres Sanchez (born 1979), a postdoctoral research fellow at the Max-Planck Institute for Solar System Research in Katlenburg-Lindau || 
|-id=285
| 9285 Le Corre ||  || Lucille Le Corre (born 1983), an associate researcher at the Planetary Science Institute in Tucson, Arizona || 
|-id=286
| 9286 Patricktaylor ||  || Patrick Alan Taylor (born 1981), a research scientist at the Arecibo Observatory studying near-Earth asteroids || 
|-id=287
| 9287 Klima ||  || Rachel L. Klima (born 1974), a planetary geologist at the Johns Hopkins University Applied Physics Laboratory || 
|-id=288
| 9288 Santos-Sanz ||  || Pablo Santos-Sanz (born 1971), a postdoctoral researcher at the "Instituto Astrofisica Andalucia" in Granada || 
|-id=289
| 9289 Balau ||  || The Balau area, near Costigliole d´Asti (Piedmont, Italy) || 
|-id=291
| 9291 Alanburdick || 1982 QO || Alan Burdick (born 1965). || 
|-id=293
| 9293 Kamogata ||  || With the neighboring town of Yakage, the town of Kamogata borders the Okayama Astrophysical Observatory, National Astronomical Observatory of Japan || 
|-id=295
| 9295 Donaldyoung ||  || Donald L. Young (born 1935) || 
|-id=297
| 9297 Marchuk || 1984 MP || Gurij Ivanovich Marchuk (born 1925), a director of the Institute of Numerical Mathematics of the Russian Academy of Sciences || 
|-id=298
| 9298 Geake || 1985 JM || John E. Geake (1925–1998), astronomer and lunar scientist at UMIST, known for his laboratory interpretation of the optical polarization of the lunar and asteroidal surfaces. He invented the first direct-reading linear refractometer, one of which he designed for the Cassini-Huygens Titan probe. || 
|-id=299
| 9299 Vinceteri ||  || Vince (born 1959) and Teri (born 1960) Grout are true friends to two-legged and four-legged animals || 
|-id=300
| 9300 Johannes || 1985 PS || Johannes Andersen (born 1943) || 
|}

9301–9400 

|-id=305
| 9305 Hazard ||  || Cyril Hazard (born 1928), a British radio astronomer. || 
|-id=306
| 9306 Pittosporum || 1987 CG || Pittosporaceae, the Australian laurel family, with nine genera and more than 200 species, mainly in tropical Africa and Pacific islands. Among the species is Pittosporum eugenioides (lemonwood). || 
|-id=307
| 9307 Regiomontanus || 1987 QS || Johannes Regiomontanus (1436–1476), a German mathematician and astronomer. || 
|-id=308
| 9308 Randyrose ||  || Randy Rose (born 1963), an electrical engineer and currently leader of the Radio Astronomy and Radar Group at Goldstone. || 
|-id=309
| 9309 Platanus ||  || Platanaceae, the plane family, with one genus and seven species. They grow wild mainly in the United States and Mexico, but they are also typical of southern France. Platanus acerifolia (London plane) reaches a height of almost 30 m and is widely planted in cities because of its resistance to air pollution. The brown, bristly fruits, hanging two to four together on a single stalk, persist over the winter. || 
|-id=313
| 9313 Protea ||  || Proteaceae, the firebush family, with some 75 genera and over 1000 species. They are native to the Southern Hemisphere, where they grow wild. Some species, such as Protea mellifera (honeyflower), extend also to the warm regions of the Northern Hemisphere. The family is best known for its ornamental plants, such as Embothrium coccineum (Chilean firebush), which are cultivated for their edible nuts. || 
|-id=315
| 9315 Weigel ||  || Erhard Weigel (1625–1699), a German mathematician and astronomer. || 
|-id=316
| 9316 Rhamnus ||  || Rhamnaceae, the buckthorn family of deciduous and evergreen trees, shrubs and climbing plants, with 60 genera and around 900 species. They grow wild in all parts of the world. Some of the species yield dyes. The berrylike fruits appear in dense clusters. Rhamnus purshina (bearwood) produces a dry bark (cascara sagrada) that is used as a laxative. || 
|-id=319
| 9319 Hartzell ||  || Christine M. Hartzell (born 1988), an assistant professor in aerospace engineering at the University of Maryland. || 
|-id=321
| 9321 Alexkonopliv || 1989 AK || Alex Konopliv (born 1960), a principal scientist at the Jet Propulsion Laboratory. || 
|-id=322
| 9322 Lindenau ||  || Bernhard von Lindenau (1779–1854), a German scientist || 
|-id=323
| 9323 Hirohisasato ||  || Hirohisa Sato (born 1951) studies the orbits and brightness of comets for the Comet Section of the Oriental Astronomical Association.  || 
|-id=325
| 9325 Stonehenge ||  || Stonehenge || 
|-id=326
| 9326 Ruta ||  || Rutaceae, the rue family, with over 150 genera and 1500 species, including citrus fruits. Ruta graviolens (common rue) is a perennial herb with a particularly strong scent. The family thrives in tropical and warm, temperate regions. || 
|-id=327
| 9327 Duerbeck ||  || Hilmar Duerbeck, a German astronomer. || 
|-id=329
| 9329 Nikolaimedtner || 1990 EO || Nikolai Karlovich Medtner, Russian composer. || 
|-id=331
| 9331 Fannyhensel ||  || Fanny Hensel (1805–1847), the sister of Felix Mendelssohn-Bartholdy and wife of painter Wilhelm Hensel. || 
|-id=333
| 9333 Hiraimasa ||  || Masanori Hirai (born 1943), a professor at Fukuoka University of Education. || 
|-id=334
| 9334 Moesta ||  || Carl Wilhelm Moesta (1825–1884), a German mathematician and astronomer, who observed stars, planets, comets and solar eclipses. From 1852 to 1867 he was the first director of the National Observatory in Santiago de Chile. || 
|-id=336
| 9336 Altenburg ||  || The town of Altenburg || 
|-id=339
| 9339 Kimnovak ||  || Kim Novak (born 1933) || 
|-id=340
| 9340 Williamholden ||  || William Holden (1918–1981) ||  
|-id=341
| 9341 Gracekelly ||  || Grace Kelly, American actress, later Her Serene Highness Princess Grace of Monaco. || 
|-id=342
| 9342 Carygrant ||  || Cary Grant (Archibald Leach, 1904–1986), British-American actor. || 
|-id=344
| 9344 Klopstock ||  || Friedrich Gottlieb Klopstock, a German poet. || 
|-id=346
| 9346 Fernandel ||  || Fernandel (Fernand Joseph Désié Contandin) (1903–1971), French actor. || 
|-id=349
| 9349 Lucas || 1991 SX || François Édouard Anatole Lucas (1842–1891), a French number theorist. || 
|-id=350
| 9350 Waseda ||  || Waseda University || 
|-id=351
| 9351 Neumayer ||  || Georg von Neumayer (1826–1909), a German geophysicist and hydrographer. || 
|-id=356
| 9356 Elineke || 1991 YV || Eline Deneweth (born 1970), named after Eline Vere, a novel by the Dutch author Louis Couperus, is the niece of the discoverer. || 
|-id=357
| 9357 Venezuela ||  || The Republica Bolivariana de Venezuela ("Little Venice") was named in 1499 by Amerigo Vespucci because of the resemblance between the natives' houses, built on water, and the situation in Venice. || 
|-id=358
| 9358 Fårö ||  || Fårö island, northernmost socken on Gotland island, Sweden †  || 
|-id=359
| 9359 Fleringe ||  || Fleringe, socken on Gotland island, Sweden †  || 
|-id=362
| 9362 Miyajima ||  || Kazuhiko Miyajima (born 1946), a professor at Doshisha University. || 
|-id=364
| 9364 Clusius ||  || Carolus Clusius (Charles de l'Escluse; 1526–1609), a Flemish botanist. || 
|-id=365
| 9365 Chinesewilson ||  || Ernest Henry "Chinese" Wilson, a prolific hunter of plants. || 
|-id=368
| 9368 Esashi ||  || Esashi, a small town in northern Hokkaido, on the Sea of Okhotsk. || 
|-id=372
| 9372 Vamlingbo ||  || Vamlingbo, socken on Gotland island, Sweden †  || 
|-id=373
| 9373 Hamra ||  || Hamra, socken on Gotland island, Sweden †  || 
|-id=374
| 9374 Sundre ||  || Sundre, southernmost socken on Gotland island, Sweden †  || 
|-id=375
| 9375 Omodaka || 1993 HK || Toshihiro Omodaka (born 1947) is a professor of radio astronomy at Kagoshima University. || 
|-id=376
| 9376 Thionville ||  || Thionville, the French city in northeastern France, near the Luxembourg border. || 
|-id=377
| 9377 Metz ||  || Metz, the French city in the Lorraine region of France, at the confluence of the Moselle and Seille rivers. || 
|-id=378
| 9378 Nancy-Lorraine ||  || Nancy-Lorraine, the French city Nancy, in the Lorraine region of France, near the left bank of the river Meuse. || 
|-id=379
| 9379 Dijon ||  || Dijon, the capital of Co\te d´Or, in east-central France. || 
|-id=380
| 9380 Mâcon ||  || Mâcon, the French city in the Bourgogne, on the right side of the river Saône. || 
|-id=381
| 9381 Lyon ||  || Lyon, the French city, capital of the Rhône departement in east-central France. || 
|-id=382
| 9382 Mihonoseki ||  || Mihonoseki, a small town and port in northeastern Shimane Prefecture. || 
|-id=383
| 9383 Montélimar ||  || Montélimar, the city in southeastern France, near the confluence of the Roubion and Rhône rivers. || 
|-id=384
| 9384 Aransio ||  || Aransio, the city of Orange in southeastern France in the department of Vaucluse. || 
|-id=385
| 9385 Avignon ||  || Avignon, the city in southeastern France, at the east bank of the Rhône river. || 
|-id=386
| 9386 Hitomi ||  || Hitomi Doi (born 1955), wife of Takao Doi, the first Japanese space walker. || 
|-id=387
| 9387 Tweedledee || 1994 CA || Tweedledee and Tweedledum, from Alice in Wonderland. || 
|-id=388
| 9388 Takeno ||  || Hyoichiro Takeno (1910–2000) and his son Setsuo Takeno (born 1936) were both professors of Hiroshima University. The former was a theoretical physicist and contributed much on the theory of spherically symmetric space-time. The latter was an experimental mineralogist and proved the stability relations of many sulfide minerals || 
|-id=389
| 9389 Condillac ||  || Étienne Bonnot de Condillac, French philosopher || 
|-id=391
| 9391 Slee ||  || Bruce Slee (born 1924), one of the pioneers of radio astronomy. || 
|-id=392
| 9392 Cavaillon ||  || Cavaillon, a small city on the road from Avignon to Digne in southern France. || 
|-id=393
| 9393 Apta ||  || French town of Apt, Vaucluse || 
|-id=394
| 9394 Manosque ||  || Manosque, a small city in southern France (Provence). || 
|-id=395
| 9395 Saint Michel ||  || Saint Michel l´Observatoire is a small village only 2 km away from the Observatory of Haute Provence. || 
|-id=396
| 9396 Yamaneakisato || 1994 QT || Akisato Yamane (born 1949) || 
|-id=397
| 9397 Lombardi || 1994 RJ || Giuseppe Lombardi (born 1939) is an Italian amateur astronomer at the CCAF observatory in Farra d´Isonzo. || 
|-id=398
| 9398 Bidelman ||  || William P. Bidelman, a director of the Warner and Swasey Observatory during 1970–1975 and professor of astronomy at Case Western Reserve University (formerly Case Institute of Technology) during 1970–1986. || 
|-id=399
| 9399 Pesch ||  || Peter Pesch, director of the Warner and Swasey Observatory during 1975–1994 and professor of astronomy at Case Western Reserve University during 1961–1997. || 
|}

9401–9500 

|-id=403
| 9403 Sanduleak ||  || Nicholas Sanduleak, American (of Romanian descent) astronomer || 
|-id=405
| 9405 Johnratje ||  || Since 1993, John R. Ratje (born 1946) has been the assistant director and site manager of Mt. Graham International Observatory, a division of Steward Observatory. Before joining Steward Observatory in 1984, he was an oil-company engineer and manager. || 
|-id=407
| 9407 Kimuranaoto ||  ||  Naoto Kimura (born 1956), lecturer and curator at the Gotoh Planetarium and Astronomical Museum in Tokyo. || 
|-id=408
| 9408 Haseakira || 1995 BC || Akira Hase, professor emeritus at Hiroshima University. || 
|-id=409
| 9409 Kanpuzan ||  || Kanpuzan, a 1763-m-high mountain to the west side of Mt. Sasagamine in the Shikoku range. || 
|-id=411
| 9411 Hitomiyamoto || 1995 CF || Hitomi Miyamoto, a scientist at the Japan Meteorological Agency. || 
|-id=413
| 9413 Eichendorff ||  || Joseph Freiherr von Eichendorff (1788–1857), a Silesian poet. || 
|-id=414
| 9414 Masamimurakami ||  || Masami Murakami || 
|-id=415
| 9415 Yujiokimura || 1995 VE || Yuji Okimura (born 1932), Hiroshima University professor emeritus, is a paleontologist and biostratigrapher of the Late Paleozoic smaller foraminifera. || 
|-id=416
| 9416 Miyahara || 1995 WS || Kenji Miyahara (1937–2011) clarified the occurrence mechanism of geological disasters in the regions of weathered granite in southwest Japan.  || 
|-id=417
| 9417 Jujiishii || 1995 WU || Juji Ishii (1865–1914), a Japanese doctor. || 
|-id=418
| 9418 Mayumi ||  || Mayumi Sato, wife of the discoverer || 
|-id=419
| 9419 Keikochaki || 1995 XS || Keiko Chaki (born 1954), the president of the Sidewalk Astronomy Society in Takatsuki, Osaka, Japan. || 
|-id=420
| 9420 Dewar ||  || Sir James Dewar, Scottish chemist and physicist. || 
|-id=421
| 9421 Violilla ||  || Violet Lilian Laurie, mother of the discoverer || 
|-id=422
| 9422 Kuboniwa ||  || Atsuo Kuboniwa (born 1964) || 
|-id=423
| 9423 Abt ||  || Helmut Abt (born 1925), one of the founders of Kitt Peak National Observatory. || 
|-id=424
| 9424 Hiroshinishiyama || 1996 BN || Hiroshi Nishiyama (born 1956) || 
|-id=425
| 9425 Marconcini ||  || Massimiliano Marconcini (1955) is an amateur astronomer of the Montelupo group. || 
|-id=426
| 9426 Aliante ||  || Italian name for a glider, the silent plane. The Latin root of the name emphasizes the key role of the wings in the absence of an engine. || 
|-id=427
| 9427 Righini ||  || Guglielmo Righini (1908–), Italian solar physicist || 
|-id=428
| 9428 Angelalouise ||  || Angela Louise Laurie, wife of the discoverer || 
|-id=429
| 9429 Poreč ||  || Porec || 
|-id=430
| 9430 Erichthonios ||  || Erichthonius of Athens, the son of Dardanos and the father of Tros. || 
|-id=431
| 9431 Pytho ||  || Pytho (Delphi), a rocky Phocian town mentioned in the Catalogue of Ships from Greek mythology. Led by Schedius and Epistrophus, the Phoceans contributed forty ships to the Greek armada during the Trojan War. || 
|-id=432
| 9432 Iba || 1997 CQ || Yasuaki Iba (1894–1957) || 
|-id=434
| 9434 Bokusen ||  || Numajiri Bokusen (1775–1856) was a Japanese educator, geographer and astronomer || 
|-id=435
| 9435 Odafukashi ||  || Fukashi Oda (born 1957), a science teacher of Shudo Junior and Senior High School in Hiroshima, Japan. || 
|-id=436
| 9436 Shudo || 1997 EB || Shudo is a private boys' junior and senior high school in Hiroshima, Japan || 
|-id=437
| 9437 Hironari ||  || Hironari Yamane (born 1980) has been director of the Kamagari Astronomical Observatory on an island of Kure City, Hiroshima, since 2009. He is an active member of the Japanese Society for Education and Popularization of Astronomy. || 
|-id=438
| 9438 Satie ||  || Erik Satie, French composer † || 
|-id=442
| 9442 Beiligong ||  || Beiligong (Beijing Institute of Technology, BIT) || 
|-id=445
| 9445 Charpentier ||  || Marc-Antoine Charpentier (1643–1704), a French musician. || 
|-id=446
| 9446 Cicero ||  || Marcus Tullius Cicero, Roman statesman || 
|-id=447
| 9447 Julesbordet ||  || Jules Bordet (1874–1961), Nobel laureate in medicine (1919). || 
|-id=448
| 9448 Donaldavies ||  || Donald W. Davies (1925–2000) || 
|-id=449
| 9449 Petrbondy ||  || Petr Kalas, alias Bondy (1944–2000), leader of the Prague Scout section Maják ("Lighthouse")  || 
|-id=450
| 9450 Akikoizumo ||  || Akiko Izumo (born 1962) is a folklorist of astronomy in Japan, who worked at a planetarium at Yokohama Science Center.  || 
|-id=452
| 9452 Rogerpeeters ||  || Roger Peeters (born 1948), head of the mechanical workshop at the Royal Observatory at Uccle. || 
|-id=453
| 9453 Mallorca ||  || Majorca, Spanish island † || 
|-id=460
| 9460 McGlynn ||  || Thomas A. McGlynn (born 1956), currently the chief archive scientist for the High Energy Science Archive Research Center at the Goddard Space Flight Center. || 
|-id=463
| 9463 Criscione ||  || Lisa Marie Criscione (born 1998) is a finalist in the 2012 Broadcom MASTERS, a math and science competition for middle-school students, for her physical sciences project. || 
|-id=466
| 9466 Shishir ||  || Shishir Hitesh Dholakia (born 1999) is a finalist in the 2012 Broadcom MASTERS, a math and science competition for middle-school students, for his earth and space sciences project. || 
|-id=468
| 9468 Brewer ||  || James Brewer, ESO astronomer working on stellar populations and carbon stars. || 
|-id=469
| 9469 Shashank ||  || Shashank Hitesh Dholakia (born 1999) is a finalist in the 2012 Broadcom MASTERS, a math and science competition for middle-school students, for his earth and space sciences project. || 
|-id=470
| 9470 Jussieu ||  || The French family of botanists: Bernard de Jussieu (1699–1777), Joseph de Jussieu (1704–1779), Antoine-Laurent de Jussieu (1748–1836), and Adrien-Laurent-Henri de Jussieu (1797–1853). || 
|-id=471
| 9471 Ostend ||  || Ostend, Belgium || 
|-id=472
| 9472 Bruges ||  || Bruges, Belgium || 
|-id=473
| 9473 Ghent ||  || Ghent, Belgium † || 
|-id=474
| 9474 Cassadrury ||  || Cassa Frances Drury (born 1999) is a finalist in the 2012 Broadcom MASTERS, a math and science competition for middle-school students, for her biochemistry, medicine, health science and microbiology project. || 
|-id=477
| 9477 Kefennell ||  || Katherine Elizabeth Fennell (born 1999) is a finalist in the 2012 Broadcom MASTERS, a math and science competition for middle-school students, for her animal and plant sciences project. || 
|-id=478
| 9478 Caldeyro || 2148 P-L || Roberto Caldeyro-Barcia (1921–1996), Uruguayan physiologist †  || 
|-id=479
| 9479 Madresplazamayo || 2175 P-L || Asociación Madres de Plaza de Mayo || 
|-id=480
| 9480 Inti || 2553 P-L || the sun god in Inca religion, also called Apu-Punchau, believed to be the ancestor of the Incas. Inti was at the head of the state cult. He was usually represented in human form, his face portrayed as a gold disk from which rays and flames extended. Inti's sister was the moon, Mama-Kilya, who was portrayed as a silver disk with human features. || 
|-id=481
| 9481 Menchú || 2559 P-L || Rigoberta Menchú Tum, Guatemalan 1992 Nobel Peace Prize winner. || 
|-id=482
| 9482 Rubéndarío || 4065 P-L || Rubén Darío (1867–1916), pseudonym of Félix Rubén Garc{í}a Sarmiento, Nicaraguan poet, journalist and diplomat. || 
|-id=483
| 9483 Chagas || 4121 P-L || Carlos Chagas (1879–1934), Brazilian epidemiologist, discoverer of Chagas disease. || 
|-id=484
| 9484 Wanambi || 4590 P-L || Rainbow Snake || 
|-id=485
| 9485 Uluru || 6108 P-L || Uluru, the Australian Aboriginal sacred place, the center or navel of the island continent. It is also known as Ayers Rock. || 
|-id=486
| 9486 Utemorrah || 6130 P-L || Daisy Utemorrah (born 1922), Australian Aboriginal poet || 
|-id=487
| 9487 Kupe || 7633 P-L || Kupe, the legendary sailor and explorer whose discovery of the islands now known as New Zealand led to the coming there of the Maori people around the ninth century || 
|-id=488
| 9488 Huia || 9523 P-L || Huia, extinct bird of New Zealand || 
|-id=489
| 9489 Tanemahuta || 1146 T-1 || For Tāne of Maori mythology; also for the particular tree in New Zealand named Tāne Mahuta || 
|-id=490
| 9490 Gosemeijer || 1181 T-1 || Henny Gosemeijer (1924–1999), Dutch amateur astronomer, founded the Public Observatory Twente in 1984. He was honored by NASA and awarded the Dutch "van der Bilt" and "Simon Stevin" prizes. || 
|-id=491
| 9491 Thooft || 1205 T-1 || Gerardus 't Hooft, Dutch 1999 Nobel physics laureate † ‡ + || 
|-id=492
| 9492 Veltman || 2066 T-1 || Martinus J. G. Veltman, Dutch 1999 Nobel physics laureate † ‡ || 
|-id=493
| 9493 Enescu || 3100 T-1 || George Enescu, Romanian musician || 
|-id=494
| 9494 Donici || 3212 T-1 || Nicolae Donici, Romanian astronomer || 
|-id=495
| 9495 Eminescu || 4177 T-1 || Mihai Eminescu, Romanian poet || 
|-id=496
| 9496 Ockels || 4260 T-1 || Wubbo Ockels, Dutch astronaut † ‡ || 
|-id=497
| 9497 Dwingeloo || 1001 T-2 || Dwingeloo Radio Observatory † || 
|-id=498
| 9498 Westerbork || 1197 T-2 || Westerbork Synthesis Radio Telescope † || 
|-id=499
| 9499 Excalibur || 1269 T-2 || Excalibur, the name of the sword of King Arthur. || 
|-id=500
| 9500 Camelot || 1281 T-2 || Camelot, the location of the castle of the King Arthur legend. || 
|}

9501–9600 

|-
| 9501 Ywain || 2071 T-2 || Owain mab Urien/Sir Ywain, legendary king of Rheged and knight of the Round Table || 
|-id=502
| 9502 Gaimar || 2075 T-2 || Gaimar, obscure legendary knight of the Round Table, lover of Morgan le Fay (mentioned in the 13th-century Lancelot und Ginevra) || 
|-id=503
| 9503 Agrawain || 2180 T-2 || Agravaine, legendary knight of the Round Table || 
|-id=504
| 9504 Lionel || 2224 T-2 || Sir Lionel, legendary knight of the Round Table || 
|-id=505
| 9505 Lohengrin || 4131 T-2 || Lohengrin, character from Arthurian legend and star of the eponymous opera || 
|-id=506
| 9506 Telramund || 5200 T-2 || Brabantine Count Friedrich (Frederick) von Telramund, character from the opera Lohengrin || 
|-id=507
| 9507 Gottfried || 5447 T-2 || Herzog (Duke) Gottfried, character from the opera Lohengrin || 
|-id=508
| 9508 Titurel || 3395 T-3 || A Fisher King, legendary guardian of the Holy Grail, father of Amfortas and a character from the opera Parsifal || 
|-id=509
| 9509 Amfortas || 3453 T-3 || A Fisher King, legendary guardian of the Holy Grail, son of Titurel and a character from the opera Parsifal || 
|-id=510
| 9510 Gurnemanz || 5022 T-3 || Gurnemanz, character from Arthurian legend, and a character from the opera Parsifal || 
|-id=511
| 9511 Klingsor || 5051 T-3 || Klingsor, sorcerous character from Arthurian legend, and in the opera Parsifal || 
|-id=512
| 9512 Feijunlong || 1966 CM || Fei Junlong, Chinese taikonaut || 
|-id=514
| 9514 Deineka ||  || Aleksandr Aleksandrovich Deineka (1899–1969) was a Russian painter known for his monumental works and panels on the subjects of labor, sport and defense of the motherland. || 
|-id=515
| 9515 Dubner ||  || Gloria Dubner, Argentinian astronomer || 
|-id=516
| 9516 Inasan ||  || INASAN, the Institute of Astronomy of the Russian Academy of Sciences in Moscow abbreviated as INASAN (Institut Astronomii Akademii Nauk), is a leading astronomical research institution, founded in 1936. Its main fields of research are stellar astrophysics, galaxies, planetary systems, geodynamics, space research, NEAs and space debris. || 
|-id=517
| 9517 Niehaisheng ||  || Nie Haisheng (born 1964), Chinese taikonaut || 
|-id=518
| 9518 Robbynaish || 1978 GA || Robby Naish, American windsurfer. || 
|-id=519
| 9519 Jeffkeck ||  || Jeffrey David Keck (born 1977) is the "Lead of Avionics development and production" of the Lucy mission. || 
|-id=520
| 9520 Montydibiasi ||  || Lamont Di Biasi (born 1941) is the "Lead for Strategic Development" of the Lucy mission. || 
|-id=521
| 9521 Martinhoffmann ||  || Martin Hoffmann (born 1949) is a German astronomer who has made observations of variable stars and minor planets, including lightcurve studies and spectroscopic investigations. In recent years he has been much involved with the observations from ODAS, the O.C.A.- DLR Asteroid Survey. The name was suggested by G. Hahn. || 
|-id=522
| 9522 Schlichting || 1981 DS || Hilke E. Schlichting (born 1982), an assistant professor of planetary science at the Massachusetts Institute of Technology. || 
|-id=523
| 9523 Torino ||  || Torino (Turin). || 
|-id=524
| 9524 O'Rourke ||  || Laurence O'Rourke (born 1970), a research scientist at the European Space Astronomy Centre in Madrid. || 
|-id=525
| 9525 Amandasickafoose ||  || Amanda Sickafoose Gulbis (born 1975), an astronomer at the South African Large Telescope and a discoverer of minor planets. Her research contributions span from theoretical studies of dust properties on small bodies, to stellar occultations of Kuiper Belt objects, to astronomical instrumentation. || 
|-id=526
| 9526 Billmckinnon ||  || William B. McKinnon (born 1954), a professor of planetary science at Washington University in St. Louis. || 
|-id=527
| 9527 Sherrypervan ||  || Sherry Pervan (born 1964) || 
|-id=528
| 9528 Küppers ||  || Michael Küppers (born 1967), a planetary scientist at the European Space Agency. || 
|-id=529
| 9529 Protopapa ||  || Silvia Protopapa (born 1981), an assistant research scientist at the University of Maryland. || 
|-id=530
| 9530 Kelleymichael ||  || Michael Sean Peterson Kelley (born 1978), an assistant research scientist at the University of Maryland. || 
|-id=531
| 9531 Jean-Luc || 1981 QK || Jean-Luc Margot (born 1969), a scientist at the Arecibo Observatory. || 
|-id=532
| 9532 Abramenko ||  || Aleksandr Nikolaevich Abramenko (born 1921), chief engineer at the Crimean Astrophysical Observatory || 
|-id=533
| 9533 Aleksejleonov ||  || Alexei Leonov, Russian cosmonaut. || 
|-id=535
| 9535 Plitchenko ||  || Aleksandr Ivanovich Plitchenko (1943–1997), a Russian writer  || 
|-id=536
| 9536 Statler ||  || Thomas S. Statler (born 1961), a professor of astronomy at Ohio University. || 
|-id=537
| 9537 Nolan || 1982 BM || Michael C. Nolan (born 1963), a scientist at the Arecibo Observatory. || 
|-id=539
| 9539 Prishvin ||  || Mikhail Mikhajlovich Prishvin, Russian writer || 
|-id=540
| 9540 Mikhalkov ||  || Sergey Vladimirovich Mikhalkov, Russian writer and poet || 
|-id=541
| 9541 Magri || 1983 CH || Christopher Magri (born 1961), a scientist at the University of Maine at Farmington. || 
|-id=542
| 9542 Eryan ||  || Eileen V. Ryan (born 1960), of New Mexico Highlands University || 
|-id=543
| 9543 Nitra ||  || Nitra, a historical town in western Slovakia, was the seat of prince Pribina and center of the Nitra principality early in the ninth century. || 
|-id=544
| 9544 Scottbirney || 1984 EL || Scott Birney (Dion Scott Birney) (born 1926), a professor of astronomy at Wellesley College, Massachusetts, from 1968 to 1991. || 
|-id=545
| 9545 Petrovedomosti || 1984 MQ || Sankt-Peterburgskie Vedomosti, oldest Russian newspaper. || 
|-id=548
| 9548 Fortran || 1985 CN || Fortran (Formula Translator), the first widely distributed symbolic programming language for digital computers. || 
|-id=549
| 9549 Akplatonov ||  || Aleksandr Konstantinovich Platonov (born 1931), a Russian mathematician and researcher in astrodynamics and robotics at the Keldysh Institute of Applied Mathematics since 1954. || 
|-id=550
| 9550 Victorblanco ||  || Victor Manuel Blanco (born 1918), director of the Cerro Tololo Interamerican Observatory from 1967 to 1981. || 
|-id=551
| 9551 Kazi || 1985 UJ || Kazi, legendary Bohemian princess, daughter of Prince Krok and the wife of Bivoj. || 
|-id=553
| 9553 Colas ||  || François Colas (born 1959), an expert on modern solar-system astrometry at the Institut de Mécanique. || 
|-id=554
| 9554 Dumont || 1985 XA || Simone Dumont (born 1924), a Meudon mathematician and astronomer. || 
|-id=555
| 9555 Frejakocha || 1986 GC || Freja Koch Augustesen, granddaughter of one of the discoverers || 
|-id=556
| 9556 Gaywray || 1986 GF || Gay Firestone Wray is a contributor to astronomy research through the Firestone postdoctoral fellowship at the Smithsonian Astrophysical Observatory. || 
|-id=560
| 9560 Anguita || 1987 EQ || Claudio Anguita Cáceres (1930–2000), a Chilean astrometrist at the Universidad de Chile, critically helpful during the establishment of the Cerro Tololo Interamerican Observatory, and an IAU Vice President during 1994–2000. The name was suggested by F. Vilas. || 
|-id=561
| 9561 van Eyck ||  || Jan van Eyck, Flemish painter. || 
|-id=562
| 9562 Memling || 1987 RG || Hans Memling (1430–1494), a Flemish painter. || 
|-id=563
| 9563 Kitty ||  || Katherine ("Kitty") F. Putnam (born 1916), president of the Springfield, Massachusetts, Television Corporation from 1975 through 1984. || 
|-id=564
| 9564 Jeffwynn ||  || Jeffrey C. Wynn || 
|-id=565
| 9565 Tikhonov ||  || Andrej Nikolaevich Tikhonov (1906–1993), a Russian mathematician. || 
|-id=566
| 9566 Rykhlova ||  || Lidiya Vasil'evna Rykhlova, head of the Space Astrometry Department of the Institute of Astronomy, Russian Academy of Sciences, is a specialist in the astrometry and dynamics of artificial satellites and an expert on earth rotation. || 
|-id=567
| 9567 Surgut ||  || Surgut || 
|-id=569
| 9569 Quintenmatsijs ||  || Quinten Matsijs (1466–1530), a Flemish painter. || 
|-id=573
| 9573 Matsumotomas || 1988 UC || Masaru Matsumoto (born 1936) lived in the house in Mihonseki, Shimane Prefecture, that was struck by a 6.4-kg meteorite on 1992 Dec. 10. || 
|-id=574
| 9574 Taku ||  || Hiroshi Nakamura (1891–1974), a Japanese medical biochemist and researcher of old maps. || 
|-id=576
| 9576 van der Weyden ||  || Rogier van der Weyden (1399–1464), a Flemish painter. || 
|-id=577
| 9577 Gropius ||  || Walter Gropius, a German architect. || 
|-id=578
| 9578 Klyazma ||  || Klyazma river, whose source is north of Moscow, and which is connected by the Oka river with the Volga at Nizhny Novgorod || 
|-id=579
| 9579 Passchendaele ||  || Passchendaele is a village in West Flanders, close to Ypres. The village was first mentioned in 844 as Pascandale || 
|-id=580
| 9580 Tarumi ||  || Tarumi, a ward of Kobe City where the first discoverer was born and lives. || 
|-id=583
| 9583 Clerke ||  || Agnes Mary Clerke (1842–1907) was an Irish astronomer. || 
|-id=584
| 9584 Louchheim ||  || Thomas Louchheim (born 1957) || 
|-id=587
| 9587 Bonpland ||  || Aimé Bonpland (Aimé Jacques Goujard Bonpland) (1773–1858), a physician. || 
|-id=588
| 9588 Quesnay ||  || François Quesnay, a physician. || 
|-id=589
| 9589 Deridder ||  || Remi Adolph De Ridder (1843–1930), a professor of law at Ghent University. In 1881 he was appointed by the government to membership in the School Commission and denounced the monopoly of the clergy in the school system. || 
|-id=590
| 9590 Hyria ||  || Hyria, from Greek mythology. It was a location mentioned in Homer's Catalogue of Ships related to the Trojan War. In Hyria, the Boetian assembled their contingent to the Greek armada. || 
|-id=592
| 9592 Clairaut ||  || Alexis Clairaut (Alexis-Claude Clairaut) (1713–1765), French mathematician who tackled the gravitational three-body problem. || 
|-id=594
| 9594 Garstang || 1991 RG || Roy Henry Garstang (1925–2009) made basic contributions in atomic physics and astronomical spectroscopy. A pioneer in modeling light pollution, he promoted night sky protection. Assistant director of the University of London Observatory (1959–1964), he then joined the faculty of the University of Colorado in Boulder || 
|-id=599
| 9599 Onotomoko ||  || Tomoko Ono (born 1968), one of the most active staff members in the Public Relations Center at the National Astronomical Observatory of Japan. || 
|}

9601–9700 

|-id=602
| 9602 Oya ||  || Reinosuke Oya (born 1923) || 
|-id=604
| 9604 Bellevanzuylen || 1991 YW || Belle van Zuylen, pseudonym for Isabella Agneta Elisabeth van Tuyll van Serooskerken, 18th-century Dutch writer from the Enlightenment || 
|-id=609
| 9609 Ponomarevalya ||  || Valentina Leonidovna Ponomareva (born 1934), of the Institute of History of Science and Technology, is a specialist on aircraft and spacecraft || 
|-id=610
| 9610 Vischer || 1992 RQ || Peter Vischer the Elder (c. 1460–1529), the greatest German brass-caster master in the Middle Ages. || 
|-id=611
| 9611 Anouck ||  || Anouck Vrouwe (born 1978) studied physics at Nijmegen, specializing later in scientific journalism. At Davros (Switzerland), she has been involved with the study of wind velocities in order to derive models for the prediction of avalanches. || 
|-id=612
| 9612 Belgorod ||  || Belgorod || 
|-id=614
| 9614 Cuvier ||  || Georges Cuvier (1769–1832), a French zoologist. || 
|-id=615
| 9615 Hemerijckx ||  || Frans Hemerijckx (1902–1969), a medical doctor who went in 1929 to Africa and India to fight against leprosy. || 
|-id=617
| 9617 Grahamchapman ||  || Graham Chapman, British member of Monty Python † || 
|-id=618
| 9618 Johncleese ||  || John Cleese, British actor and member of Monty Python † || 
|-id=619
| 9619 Terrygilliam ||  || Terry Gilliam, British film maker and member of Monty Python † || 
|-id=620
| 9620 Ericidle ||  || Eric Idle, British member of Monty Python † || 
|-id=621
| 9621 Michaelpalin ||  || Michael Palin, British member of Monty Python † || 
|-id=622
| 9622 Terryjones ||  || Terry Jones, British member of Monty Python † || 
|-id=623
| 9623 Karlsson ||  || Per Olow Karlsson, Swedish technician at Uppsala Observatory and Kvistabergs Observatorium † || 
|-id=626
| 9626 Stanley ||  || John Stanley (1713–1786) || 
|-id=628
| 9628 Sendaiotsuna ||  || Sendai Otsunahiki, a 400-year-old tug-of-war festival, held in Satsumasendai City in the evening of the day before the Autumnal Equinox. || 
|-id=629
| 9629 Servet ||  || Miguel Serveto y Reves (Michel Servet, 1511–1553), a doctor of medicine and a theologian living in France. || 
|-id=630
| 9630 Castellion ||  || Sébastien Castellion (1515–1563), a French humanist  || 
|-id=631
| 9631 Hubertreeves ||  || Hubert Reeves, a professional astronomer at the French CNRS. || 
|-id=632
| 9632 Sudo ||  || Kenichi Sudo (born 1958), a Japanese medical technologist and amateur astronomer. || 
|-id=633
| 9633 Cotur ||  || Peter Cotur (born 1944), Belgian scientific journalist || 
|-id=634
| 9634 Vodice || 1993 XB || Antonio Nino Vodice (born 1943) an Italian banking accountant and amateur astronomer, who is a member of the astronomical society at the Farra d'Isonzo Observatory (Circolo Culturale Astronomico di Farra d'Isonzo) responsible for public relations and organizing conferences. || 
|-id=637
| 9637 Perryrose ||  || Perry J. Rose (born 1966) is a former member of the Palomar Planet Crossing Asteroid Survey and currently lead solar observer on the 18-meter solar tower at Mt. Wilson Observatory. || 
|-id=638
| 9638 Fuchs ||  || Leonhard Fuchs (1501–1566), German botanist and physician || 
|-id=639
| 9639 Scherer ||  || Marc Scherer (born 1944), Belgian scientist || 
|-id=640
| 9640 Lippens ||  || Carlos Lippens (born 1945), Belgian scientist || 
|-id=641
| 9641 Demazière ||  || Martine De Mazière (born 1960), Belgian scientist || 
|-id=642
| 9642 Takatahiro || 1994 RU || Hiroyuki Takata (born 1961), a Japanese amateur astronomer and chief editor of the newsletter of the Chiba Science Society. || 
|-id=645
| 9645 Grünewald ||  || Matthias Grünewald (c. 1460–1528), German Renaissance painter and watercolor artist || 
|-id=648
| 9648 Gotouhideo ||  || Gotou Hideo (born 1951) is a Japanese amateur astronomer who was born in Oogaki, Gifu prefecture. He has coordinated an observatory at Ooto-mura and also designed a 0.25-m reflector there after he graduated from Doshisha University. || 
|-id=649
| 9649 Junfukue || 1995 XG || Jun Fukue (born 1956), professor at Osaka Kyoiku University, works on theoretical studies concerning accretion disks embedded in quasars and black holes. || 
|-id=650
| 9650 Okadaira || 1995 YG || The Okadaira Shell Mound located in Miho village, Ibaraki prefecture, was built on the south coast of Lake Kasumigaura about 7,000 to 3,500 years ago.  || 
|-id=651
| 9651 Arii-SooHoo || 1996 AJ || Computer mathematician Vicki Arii-SooHoo (born 1962) became team leader at AMOS in 1997 and is directly responsible for the successes of the AMOS program. || 
|-id=654
| 9654 Seitennokai ||  || Seitennokai, an astronomy club in Japan, which was founded in 1985, with about 20 members. || 
|-id=655
| 9655 Yaburanger ||  || Yaburanger is a nickname for Japanese amateur castle researchers in Ibaraki and Chiba prefectures. `Yabu' means bush in Japanese. The Yaburangers explore castles from the Middle Ages, and they wrote the book Castles in Ibaraki. || 
|-id=657
| 9657 Učka ||  || Učka, the highest mountain on the Istrian peninsula, which extends into the northern Adriatic sea. || 
|-id=658
| 9658 Imabari ||  || Imabari, Japanese city || 
|-id=661
| 9661 Hohmann ||  || Walter Hohmann, German civil engineer † || 
|-id=662
| 9662 Frankhubbard || 1996 GS || Frank Hubbard (1920–1976), an American harpsichord maker. || 
|-id=663
| 9663 Zwin ||  || Zwin, natural reserve on the Belgian-Dutch coast † || 
|-id=664
| 9664 Brueghel ||  || Pieter Brueghel, Flemish painter || 
|-id=665
| 9665 Inastronoviny || 1996 LA || IAN, or Instantní Astronomické Noviny, is a Czech Internet Astronomical Newspaper founded by Jirí Dusek and Rudolf Novák in Brno in 1997. || 
|-id=667
| 9667 Amastrinc ||  || Amateur Astronomers, Inc., now at Union County College, Cranford, New Jersey, where it built the William Miller Sperry Observatory || 
|-id=668
| 9668 Tianyahaijiao || 1997 LN || "Tianya Haijiao", which literally means "edge of the sky, rim of the sea", is the name of a famous rocky outcrop of historical significance on the south coast of Hainan Island just to the west of Sanya, the southernmost city in China || 
|-id=669
| 9669 Symmetria ||  || Name suggested by the palindromic shape of the numeral 9669, and the fact that each pair of its digits is invariant under a rotation by 180 degrees || 
|-id=670
| 9670 Magni ||  || Gianfranco Magni (born 1943), who joined the Istituto di Astrofisica Spaziale in Rome in 1975. He has worked on the physics of stellar interiors, in particular on the equation of the state of gas at high pressure and temperature. Currently, his main field of interest is the origin of the solar system and of planetary systems in general, with special attention to the structure and evolution of circumstellar disks and the formation of giant planets. Involved also in the study of the origin and structure of comets, he is a team member of the cometary mission Rosetta.  || 
|-id=671
| 9671 Hemera ||  || Hemera, the primordial Greek goddess of bright day. She is the daughter of the goddess of night Nykta and the god of darkness Erebus. Hemera means "day" in Greek and gives rise to the word "ephemeris". || 
|-id=672
| 9672 Rosenbergerezek ||  || Kamila Rosenberger and Tomaš Rezek, friends of the discoverer (Tomaš worked for two years at Ondřejov Observatory); the asteroid was named on the occasion of Tomáš and Kamila's marriage on 19 June 1999 † || 
|-id=673
| 9673 Kunishimakoto ||  || For 21 years, Makoto Kunishi (born 1954) was a lecturer and curator at the Gotoh Planetarium and Astronomical Museum in Tokyo. || 
|-id=674
| 9674 Slovenija ||  || Slovenia, the European nation and former Yugoslav republic in which the Črni Vrh Observatory is situated. This is the first minor planet credited to Slovenian astronomers. || 
|-id=676
| 9676 Eijkman || 2023 P-L || Christiaan Eijkman, Dutch physician and pathologist, winner of the Nobel Prize for Medicine and Physiology in 1929 (with Hopkins) † || 
|-id=677
| 9677 Gowlandhopkins || 2532 P-L || Frederick Gowland Hopkins, British biochemist, winner of the Nobel Prize for Medicine and Physiology in 1929 (with Eijkman) † || 
|-id=678
| 9678 van der Meer || 2584 P-L || Simon van der Meer, Dutch physicist, winner of the Nobel Prize for Physics in 1994 † || 
|-id=679
| 9679 Crutzen || 2600 P-L || Paul Crutzen, Dutch chemist, winner of the Nobel Prize for Chemistry in 1995 † || 
|-id=680
| 9680 Molina || 3557 P-L || Mario J. Molina (born 1943), a Mexican physical chemist and co-recipient of the Nobel Prize for Chemistry in 1995, awarded for work in atmospheric chemistry. || 
|-id=681
| 9681 Sherwoodrowland || 4069 P-L || F. Sherwood Rowland (1927–2012), American chemist and co-recipientof the Nobel Prize for Chemistry in 1995, awarded for work in atmospheric chemistry. || 
|-id=682
| 9682 Gravesande || 4073 P-L || Willem Jacob 's Gravesande, Dutch scientist and lawyer † || 
|-id=683
| 9683 Rambaldo || 4099 P-L || Alfred Emile Rambaldo (1879–1911), born on the island of Java, did extensive research on the upper layers of the atmosphere. || 
|-id=684
| 9684 Olieslagers || 4113 P-L || Jan Olieslagers (1883–1942), Belgian aviation pioneer, caused the airport Deurne (Antwerp International Airport) to be built. In 1910 he made the first overland flight between two cities in the Netherlands. His popularity helped to promote aviation there and in Belgium. The name was suggested by W. A. Fröger. || 
|-id=685
| 9685 Korteweg || 4247 P-L || Diederik Korteweg, Dutch mathematician † || 
|-id=686
| 9686 Keesom || 4604 P-L || Willem Hendrik Keesom, Dutch physicist † || 
|-id=687
| 9687 Uhlenbeck || 4614 P-L || George Eugene Uhlenbeck, Dutch-born American physicist † || 
|-id=688
| 9688 Goudsmit || 4665 P-L || Samuel Abraham Goudsmit, Dutch-born American physicist, member of the ALSOS Commission † || 
|-id=689
| 9689 Freudenthal || 4831 P-L || Hans Freudenthal, Dutch mathematician † || 
|-id=690
| 9690 Houtgast || 6039 P-L || Jacob Houtgast (1908–1982), a Dutch solar physicist || 
|-id=691
| 9691 Zwaan || 6053 P-L || Cornelis Zwaan (1928–1999), professor of astrophysics at Utrecht University || 
|-id=692
| 9692 Kuperus || 6354 P-L || Max Kuperus (born 1936), professor of astrophysics at Utrecht University, and a department chairman at the Royal Netherlands Academy of Arts and Sciences, specialized in theoretical magnetohydrodynamics and plasma physics. He wrote one of the first papers on the heating of the solar corona. || 
|-id=693
| 9693 Bleeker || 6547 P-L || Johan Bleeker (J. A. M. Bleeker), Dutch astronomer, Director of the Netherlands Foundation for Space Research † || 
|-id=694
| 9694 Lycomedes || 6581 P-L || Lycomedes, from Greek mythology, was king of Scyros during the Trojan war. At his court Thetis hid her son Achilles, dressed in girl's clothes to save him from the Trojan war. He was found by Odysseus. || 
|-id=695
| 9695 Johnheise || 6583 P-L || John Heise (born 1942), professor of general physics at Utrecht University, specialized in high-energy space physics. In 1975 he discovered and detected sources of galactic x-ray bursts (1975). He was among the discoverers in 1998 of the origin of the cosmic gamma-ray bursts. The name was suggested by C. de Jager. || 
|-id=696
| 9696 Jaffe || 6628 P-L || Walter J. Jaffe (born 1947) is an American astronomer at Leiden Observatory || 
|-id=697
| 9697 Louwman || 1295 T-1 || Peter J. K. Louwman (born 1935)  || 
|-id=698
| 9698 Idzerda || 2205 T-1 || Hanso Henricus Schotanus Steringa Idzerda (1885–1944) || 
|-id=699
| 9699 Baumhauer || 3036 T-1 || Albert Gillis von Baumhauer (1891–1939), a Dutch aviation pioneer, invented the tail rotor for helicopters and built the first Dutch helicopter, which took off on 1925 Dec. 17. || 
|-id=700
| 9700 Paech || 3058 T-1 || Wolfgang Paech (born 1951) is an electronic engineer on the staff of the Institute of Geodesy at the University of Hannover, where he serves as technical manager of the astronomical station. || 
|}

9701–9800 

|-
| 9701 Mak || 1157 T-2 || Arie Mak (born 1914), a Dutch amateur astronomers, active in lunar occultations and solar observations. He developed scientific instrumentation for and joined in the eclipse expeditions of 1959 and 1966. He received the Van der Bilt Prize in 1951. || 
|-id=702
| 9702 Tomvandijk || 2108 T-2 || Thomas van Dijk (born 1915), versatile Dutch amateur astronomer, specialized in spectroscopic, nuclear and photographic techniques. He wrote 45 papers, including one in Nature on lunar luminescence and one on radioactivity of a meteorite in the 1953 Liège Colloquium proceedings. || 
|-id=703
| 9703 Sussenbach || 3146 T-2 || John Sussenbach (born 1938) is a Dutch amateur astronomer known for his excellent sky photographs. He founded the Dutch Working Group for Sky Photography and received the Van der Bilt Prize. The name was suggested by C. de Jager. || 
|-id=704
| 9704 Georgebeekman || 5469 T-2 || George W. E. Beekman (born 1944) is one of the Netherlands' best science writers in the field of astronomy, known for his weekly contributions in the daily paper NRC-Handelsblad. He has been editor-in-chief of the journal Zenit and is still a member of the editorial board of that monthly. The name was suggested by C. de Jager. || 
|-id=705
| 9705 Drummen || 3137 T-3 || Mat Drummen (born 1945) has been director of "de Koepel", the Dutch center for dissemination of information on astronomy, space science and meteorology since 1975. He is author of the annual Sterrengids and coeditor of the Dutch popular journal Zenit. The name was suggested by C. de Jager. || 
|-id=706
| 9706 Bouma || 3176 T-3 || Reinder J. Bouma (born 1949), one of the best known Dutch amateur astronomers. || 
|-id=707
| 9707 Petruskoning || 3226 T-3 || Petrus A. Koning (born 1934) has organized youth astronomy camps. Founder of the Bussloo Public Observatory, he was long a member of the observatory board. In 1995 he received the Van der Bilt Prize for his efforts to promote astronomy in the Dutch province of Gelderland. The name was suggested by W. A. Fröger. || 
|-id=708
| 9708 Gouka || 4140 T-3 || Adriaan Jacobus Gouka (1879–1963) and Christiaan A. C. Nell founded NVWS, the Dutch Astronomical and Meteorological Society on 1 September 1901. The name was suggested by H. van Woerden. || 
|-id=709
| 9709 Chrisnell || 5192 T-3 || Christiaan A. C. Nell (1875–1960) was cofounder, together with Adriaan J. Gouka, of the Dutch Astronomical and Meteorological Society. With 4000 members, the society continues to flourish on its 100th anniversary. The name was suggested by H. van Woerden. || 
|-id=711
| 9711 Želetava || 1972 PA || Bearing a 13:12:5 Pythagorean relationship to (8964) [Corvus] Corax and (3735) Trebon, (9711) Zeletava is a small Moravian town near the center of the hypotenuse of a similar triangle with short leg centered on Trebon, Bohemia, and long leg running through Vranov (crow, Corvus), Moravia, and Raabs (raven, Corax), Austria. || 
|-id=712
| 9712 Nauplius ||  || Nauplius, from Greek mythology, a son of Poseidon and Amymone. He was king of Euboea and father of Palamedes. || 
|-id=713
| 9713 Oceax ||  || Oceax, from Greek mythology, is the son of Nauplius of Euboea and brother of Palamedes. || 
|-id=714
| 9714 Piazzismyth ||  || Charles Piazzi Smyth (1819–1900) was an Italian-born British astronomer, working on spherical astronomy and geodesy in South Africa, before becoming the 2nd Astronomer Royal for Scotland. He is known for his work on solar spectroscopy and his pyramidological and metrological studies of the Great Pyramid of Giza. The lunar crater Piazzi Smyth (crater) is named after him. || 
|-id=715
| 9715 Paolotanga ||  || Paolo Tanga (born 1966), an adjoint astronomer at the Observatoire de la Côte d´Azur. || 
|-id=716
| 9716 Severina || 1975 UE || Severina Feitknecht-Gallati (1945–2000), who hailed from Glarus, the same home town as the discoverer, was a highly esteemed physician at Interlaken. || 
|-id=717
| 9717 Lyudvasilia ||  || Lyudmila Vasil'evna Shaposhnikova (born 1926), orientalist and writer. || 
|-id=718
| 9718 Gerbefremov ||  || Gerbert Alexandrovich Efremov (born 1933), a Russian designer of space technology, created the Proton rocket and Almaz space stations. He is a member of Tsiolkovsky Russian Academy of Cosmonautics and was decorated with the Leonardo da Vinci Medal of the International Association of Peace Foundations. || 
|-id=719
| 9719 Yakage ||  || With the neighboring town of Kamogata, the town of Yakage borders the Okayama Astrophysical Observatory, National Astronomical Observatory of Japan. || 
|-id=720
| 9720 Ulfbirgitta ||  || Ulf and Birgitta Heyman, friends of the discoverer † || 
|-id=721
| 9721 Doty || 1980 GB || Arthur G. Doty (1951–1999), an amateur astronomer. || 
|-id=722
| 9722 Levi-Montalcini || 1981 EZ || In 1952 Italian neurologist Rita Levi-Montalcini (born 1909) discovered the Nerve Growth Factor, the protein responsible for the nervous system cell proliferation. Winner of the 1986 Nobel prize for Medicine, she promotes programs for educating women in developing countries || 
|-id=723
| 9723 Binyang ||  || Bin Yang (born 1977), a research fellow at the European Southern Observatory in Chile. || 
|-id=724
| 9724 Villanueva ||  || Geronimo L. Villanueva (born 1978), a research assistant professor of physics at Catholic University of America. || 
|-id=725
| 9725 Wainscoat ||  || Richard J. Wainscoat (born 1961), an astronomer at the University of Hawaii. || 
|-id=726
| 9726 Verbiscer ||  || Anne J. Verbiscer (born 1964), an associate research professor at the University of Virginia. || 
|-id=727
| 9727 Skrutskie ||  || Michael F. Skrutskie (born 1959), a professor of astronomy at the University of Virginia. || 
|-id=728
| 9728 Videen ||  || Gordon Videen (born 1964), a research scientist with the Space Science Institute of Boulder, Colorado. || 
|-id=732
| 9732 Juchnovski ||  || Ivan Juchnovski (born 1937), president of the Bulgarian Academy of Sciences since 1996. || 
|-id=733
| 9733 Valtikhonov ||  || Valentin Fedorovich Tikhonov (1938–2004), Russian astrophysicist and member of the Russian Mission Control Center, took an active part in realization of many deep space missions. He also developed a relativistic theory of the inner planets, as well as new theories of the motions of comet 1P/Halley and the satellites of Mars. || 
|-id=737
| 9737 Dudarova ||  || Veronica Borisovna Dudarova (born 1916), the only woman conductor in Russia. || 
|-id=739
| 9739 Powell ||  || James Lawrence Powell, director of the Natural History Museum of Los Angeles County, professor of geology at Oberlin College. || 
|-id=741
| 9741 Solokhin ||  || Valentin Fedorovich Solokhin (born 1933), the director general of a company in Surgut of the Tyumen province in Siberia. || 
|-id=742
| 9742 Worpswede ||  || German town of Worpswede, home of an artistic community of the same name || 
|-id=743
| 9743 Tohru || 1988 GD || Tohru Takahashi (born 1959) is a professor of information optics at the Oita National College of Technology. His research interest includes adaptive optics. As an amateur astronomer, he has led the Astronomical Society of Oita since its foundation. The name was suggested by Y. Yamada. || 
|-id=744
| 9744 Nielsen || 1988 JW || As the physician responsible for the mental and physical fitness of a close-knit team of researchers, construction workers and support staff at the Amundsen-Scott South Pole research station, Jerri Nielsen (born 1952) is noted for her friendship and concern for the "Polies" and her courage to face her own serious illness. || 
|-id=745
| 9745 Shinkenwada || 1988 VY || Shinken Wada, Japanese NHK announcer. || 
|-id=746
| 9746 Kazukoichikawa ||  || Kazuko Ichikawa, Japanese teddy-bear artist || 
|-id=748
| 9748 van Ostaijen ||  || Paul van Ostaijen (1896–1928), Flemish poet who influenced Belgian and Dutch poetry. || 
|-id=749
| 9749 Van den Eijnde ||  || Peter Van den Eijnde (born 1966) has academic degrees in German philology and management and has always been active in astronomy. During the 1980s he helped the discoverer with the reduction of astrometric work. He is now park manager of the Antwerp Zoo. || 
|-id=751
| 9751 Kadota || 1990 QM || Ken-ichi Kadota (born 1961), a computer engineer and renowned amateur astronomer in Ageo, Saitama prefecture. || 
|-id=756
| 9756 Ezaki ||  || Yusuke Ezaki (born 1957), a CCD astrometric observer in Toyonaka, Osaka prefecture. || 
|-id=757
| 9757 Felixdejager ||  || Felix de Jager (born 1999) is the second grandson of the discoverer and son of Sigyn and Philip de Jager-Elst. The fourth generation of professional musicians, Felix shows great love and ability for musical performance. || 
|-id=758
| 9758 Dainty ||  || John Christopher Dainty (born 1947), British optical physicist and professor of optics at Imperial College, London. || 
|-id=761
| 9761 Krautter ||  || Joachim Krautter (born 1948) is associate director of the Heidelberg Königstuhl Observatory and a well-known expert on pre-main-sequence stars and novae. He is also engaged in European astronomical organizations and serves as president of the Astronomische Gesellschaft (2002–2005). || 
|-id=762
| 9762 Hermannhesse ||  || Hermann Hesse, German writer || 
|-id=764
| 9764 Morgenstern ||  || Christian Morgenstern, German poet, writer and translator || 
|-id=766
| 9766 Bradbury ||  || Ray Douglas Bradbury (born 1920), the critically acclaimed science fiction author whose works include The Martian Chronicles and The Illustrated Man. || 
|-id=767
| 9767 Midsomer Norton ||  || Midsomer Norton, English town || 
|-id=768
| 9768 Stephenmaran ||  || Stephen P. Maran (born 1938), American astronomer and veteran of the space program, has made outstanding contributions to public understanding of astronomy as press officer for the American Astronomical Society. He has conducted professional research on many different telescopes and has lectured and written extensively on space discoveries. || 
|-id=769
| 9769 Nautilus ||  || Nautilus, submarine in Jules Verne's Twenty Thousand Leagues Under the Sea. || 
|-id=770
| 9770 Discovery || 1993 EE || "Discovery" was the name of the spaceship in Arthur Clarke's novel and Stanley Kubrick's movie 2001: A Space Odyssey. It is also the name of one of NASA's Space Shuttle Discovery. || 
|-id=774
| 9774 Annjudge || 1993 NO || Ann Campana Judge (1951–2001), the travel office manager for the National Geographic Society. || 
|-id=775
| 9775 Joeferguson ||  || Joe Ferguson (1962–2001), director of the geography education outreach program for the National Geographic Society. || 
|-id=777
| 9777 Enterprise || 1994 OB || The Starship Enterprise, of Star Trek fame, or the Space Shuttle of the same name. || 
|-id=778
| 9778 Isabelallende ||  || Isabel Allende, Chilean writer. || 
|-id=780
| 9780 Bandersnatch || 1994 SB || Bandersnatch, from Lewis Carroll's Jabberwocky. || 
|-id=781
| 9781 Jubjubbird ||  || Jubjub Bird, from Lewis Carroll's Jabberwocky. || 
|-id=782
| 9782 Edo || 1994 WM || Edo is the former name for Tokyo, the capital and largest city of Japan. || 
|-id=783
| 9783 Tensho-kan ||  || Tensho-kan, the first planetarium in Japan, located at the science center in Osaka. || 
|-id=784
| 9784 Yotsubashi ||  || Yotsubashi, in the center of Osaka, is where the astronomers of the Edo period observed eclipses. || 
|-id=785
| 9785 Senjikan ||  || Senjikan, an astronomy group in Osaka in the Edo period. || 
|-id=786
| 9786 Gakutensoku || 1995 BB || Gakutensoku, the first Japanese robot, created in 1928 by Makoto Nishimura. || 
|-id=788
| 9788 Yagami ||  || Junko Yagami (born 1958), a renowned singer-songwriter. || 
|-id=790
| 9790 Deipyrus ||  || Deipyrus, from Greek mythology. During the Trojan War, he was one of seven captains of sentinels sent to guard the Greek ships. He was later killed by the prophet Helenus, King Priam's son. || 
|-id=791
| 9791 Kamiyakurai ||  || Yakuraisan, popularly called Kami Fuji, is a mountain located in the town of Kami in northeastern Japan. People come here to enjoy beautiful seasonal nature, flowers and starry nights. || 
|-id=792
| 9792 Nonodakesan ||  || Nonodakesan is a mountain located in the town of Wakuya in northeastern Japan. Konpo-ji Temple, popularly called Nonodake Kannon, was constructed on the summit of Nonodake in the eighth century. || 
|-id=793
| 9793 Torvalds ||  || Linus Benedict Torvalds, Finnish developer of Linux. || 
|-id=795
| 9795 Deprez ||  || Brigitte Deprez (born 1939), the wife of Uccle astronomer Jozef Denoyelle, colleague of the discoverer. || 
|-id=796
| 9796 Robotti || 1996 HW || Aurelio Robotti (1913–1994) was a lieutenant in the Italian Air Engineers and later professor in aerospace engineering at the Turin Polytechnic. He began studies on rocket fuel using liquid oxygen and ethanol, and tested the first Italian-built liquid-fuel missile. || 
|-id=797
| 9797 Raes ||  || Hugo Raes (born 1929), a Flemish writer. || 
|-id=799
| 9799 Thronium || 1996 RJ || Thronium, near the river Boagrius, was one of the places from which the Locrians joined the Achean forces. || 
|-id=800
| 9800 Shigetoshi ||  || Shigetoshi Inoue (born 1961), a Japanese amateur astronomer and a key member of Ota Astronomical Club. || 
|}

9801–9900 

|-id=804
| 9804 Shrikulkarni || 1997 NU || Shrinivas Kulkarni (born 1956) was a co-discoverer of the first millisecond pulsar, the first optical counterpart of a binary pulsar, the first pulsar in a globular cluster, the extragalactic origin of gamma-ray bursts and the first brown dwarf. || 
|-id=807
| 9807 Rhene ||  || Rhene, a nymph from Greek mythology. She was the mother of Medon, one of the Achaean Leaders, who took over Philoctetes' men after the latter was bitten by a snake. || 
|-id=809
| 9809 Jimdarwin ||  || James L. Darwin (born 1939), instrument maker at Lowell Observatory. || 
|-id=810
| 9810 Elanfiller ||  || Elan Eng Filler (born 1998) is a finalist in the 2012 Broadcom MASTERS, a math and science competition for middle-school students, for her biochemistry, medicine, health science and microbiology project. || 
|-id=811
| 9811 Cavadore || 1998 ST || Cyril Cavadore (born 1969), French electronic engineer and discoverer of minor planets at the European Southern Observatory (Src) || 
|-id=812
| 9812 Danco ||  || Emile Danco (1869–1898), who participated in the Antarctic expedition of Adrien de Gerlache, was responsible for the photography and observation of geomagnetism. He died during the trip, and his body was buried at sea near a newly discovered land, named Dancoland. || 
|-id=813
| 9813 Rozgaj ||  || Slavko Rozgaj (1895–1978), director of the Zagreb Observatory, was a prolific author of astronomy books and articles. His best-known book is A Book About Stars. || 
|-id=814
| 9814 Ivobenko ||  || Baron Ivo von Benko of Bojnik (1851–1903) was the director of the Pola Observatory. He developed systematic work on the meridian circle and compiled a catalogue of fundamental stars. He is best known for the observation that ruled out the existence of the earth's second moon. || 
|-id=815
| 9815 Mariakirch || 2079 P-L || Maria Margarethe Kirch, née Winkelmann (1670–1720), wife and mother of astronomers, was an astronomer in her own right, observing, computing and publishing calendars, working in Berlin and Danzig. Although the comet of April 1702 was first credited to her husband, she was later acknowledged as the discoverer. || 
|-id=816
| 9816 von Matt || 2643 P-L || Baroness Elisabeth von Matt (Elisabeth Freiin von Matt), Austrian astronomer. || 
|-id=817
| 9817 Thersander || 6540 P-L || Thersander, a son of the Theban Polynices, was wounded by Telephus and later was one of the heroes in the Wooden Horse. || 
|-id=818
| 9818 Eurymachos || 6591 P-L || Eurymachos, one of the heroes hidden in the Wooden Horse. || 
|-id=819
| 9819 Sangerhausen || 2172 T-1 || In the vicinity of the German city of Sangerhausen, a remarkable archaeological object was unearthed. || 
|-id=820
| 9820 Hempel || 3064 T-1 || Rolf Hempel (born 1956) is a German mathematician and amateur astronomer who determined many high-quality positions of minor planets using a quite unconventional measuring device. His orbit determination software is still in use at the Astronomisches Rechen-Institut. The name was suggested by L. D. Schmadel. || 
|-id=821
| 9821 Gitakresáková || 4033 T-1 || Margita Kresáková (née Margita Vozárová), Slovak astronomer, wife of astronomer Ľubor Kresák; Comet Vozárová is also named after her † || 
|-id=822
| 9822 Hajduková || 4114 T-1 || Mária Hajduková (born 1934), a Slovak astronomer currently at the Astronomical Institute Comenius University, Bratislava (Modra Observatory), has been active in interplanetary matter research, mainly meteors---multicolor photometry and radiation (dependence of the color index on velocity). She educated a whole generation of astronomers in Slovakia. || 
|-id=823
| 9823 Annantalová || 4271 T-1 || Anna Antalová (born 1936) has worked at the Astronomical Institute, Slovak Academy of Sciences, Tatranská Lomnica, since 1958. She made various analyses of solar phenomena and significant contributions to the study of solar flares as well as solar cycle characteristics. The name was suggested by D. Chochol. || 
|-id=824
| 9824 Marylea || 3033 T-2 || Mary Lea Shane, née Heger (1897–1983), wife of Lick Observatory director C. Donald Shane. || 
|-id=825
| 9825 Oetken || 1214 T-3 || Lore Oetken (born 1929) has made significant contributions to the fields of magnetic stars, polarimetry and spectroscopy, a prominent part of the astronomical research at the Potsdam Observatory. The citation was prepared by A. Schnell. || 
|-id=826
| 9826 Ehrenfreund || 2114 T-3 || Pascale Ehrenfreund, Dutch astrobiologist † || 
|-id=828
| 9828 Antimachos || 1973 SS || Antimachos, one of the heroes hidden in the Wooden Horse. || 
|-id=829
| 9829 Murillo ||  || Bartolomé Estéban Murillo (1618–1682) created many religious paintings for churches. The painter from Seville is famous for his genre pictures of children that were poor but happy, and these are imitated even today. || 
|-id=830
| 9830 Franciswasiak ||  || Francis C. Wasiak (born 1966) is the "Ground Systems Manager" and "Concept of Operations Lead" of the Lucy mission. || 
|-id=831
| 9831 Simongreen || 1979 QZ || Simon F. Green, British astronomer † || 
|-id=832
| 9832 Xiaobinwang ||  || Xiao-bin Wang (born 1966), an astronomer at the Yunnan Observatory, Chinese Academy of Sciences. || 
|-id=833
| 9833 Rilke ||  || Rainer Maria Rilke, Austrian poet || 
|-id=834
| 9834 Kirsanov ||  || Semen Isaakovich Kirsanov (1906–1972), Russian poet || 
|-id=836
| 9836 Aarseth || 1985 TU || Sverre Aarseth (Årseth), Norwegian astronomer. || 
|-id=837
| 9837 Jerryhorow ||  || Jerome Horowitz, father of the discoverer. || 
|-id=838
| 9838 Falz-Fein ||  || Baron Eduard Aleksandrovich von Falz-Fein (born 1912) is an outstanding collector of works of art and historical documents, known for his charity. Born in Russia, his uncle Friedrich Falz-Fein was the founder in 1875 of the well-known reserve Askania-Nova in Ukraine. || 
|-id=839
| 9839 Crabbegat ||  || Crabbegat is an idyllic road at the border of the Wolvendael park, close to the Royal Observatory at Uccle. The name might refer to "crab", although Uccle is located near neither the sea nor even a stream. || 
|-id=841
| 9841 Mašek || 1988 UT || Martin Mašek (born 1988) is an avid observer of deep-sky objects, variable stars, comets and asteroids. || 
|-id=842
| 9842 Funakoshi ||  || Hiromi Funakoshi (born 1961) works in Gifu prefecture's Fujihashi village office. He previously contributed to the spread of astronomy awareness as a researcher at Nishi Mino Observatory and still performs volunteer work there. || 
|-id=843
| 9843 Braidwood ||  || Thomas Braidwood (1715–1806), a Scottish teacher of the deaf. || 
|-id=844
| 9844 Otani ||  || Toyokazu Otani (born 1928), first lecturer at the Gotoh Planetarium and Astronomical Museum in Tokyo. || 
|-id=845
| 9845 Okamuraosamu ||  || Osamu Okamura (born 1954) is a Japanese certified public accountant and an amateur astronomer. || 
|-id=848
| 9848 Yugra ||  || Yugra is the historical name, used in Russia in medieval times, of the vast area to the east of the Northern Urals, extending to the river Taz. Inhabited then by the Hanty and Mansi tribes, it is now part of the territory of the Hanty-Mansi autonomous area within the Russian Federation. || 
|-id=850
| 9850 Ralphcopeland ||  || Ralph Copeland (1837–1905), an English astronomer and 3rd Astronomer Royal for Scotland, was an observer of comets and discoverer of planetary nebula by means of visual spectroscopy. He also observed the 1874 and 1882 transits of Venus and used the Leviathan of Parsonstown telescope to re-visit the nebulae in the catalogues of Charles Messier and John Herschel, and discovered several NGC objects including the Copeland Septet. || 
|-id=851
| 9851 Sakamoto ||  || Makoto Sakamoto, a research fellow of the Nishi-Harima Astronomical Observatory. || 
|-id=852
| 9852 Gora || 1990 YX || Ronald Gora (born 1933), a former American swimmer. || 
|-id=853
| 9853 l'Épée ||  || Charles-Michel de l'Épée (1712–1789) was a French philanthropic educator who has become known as the "Father of the Deaf", as he believed that the deaf were capable of acquiring language. He founded the first free public school for the deaf in Paris in 1760. || 
|-id=854
| 9854 Karlheinz ||  || Karlheinz Müller (born 1943), a German amateur astronomer and an agricultural clerk by profession. From his youth on, he committed himself to astrophotography and brightness estimates of variable stars. He has directed the Volkssternwarte Drebach since 1969 and oversaw the completion of a Zeiss planetarium and a new main building. He has helped popularize astronomy for people of all ages. Müller created the conditions for observing minor planets in Drebach. This minor planet was numbered with the help of positions observed in Drebach in 1996 and 1998. || 
|-id=855
| 9855 Thomasdick || 1991 CU || Thomas Dick (1774–1857) a Scottish astronomer, science teacher, writer and church minister, known for combining science, religion and philosophy and who had a substantial impact on the American education system. || 
|-id=857
| 9857 Hecamede || 1991 EN || Hecamede, daughter of Arsinoos from Greek mythology. She was held captive by King Nestor. || 
|-id=859
| 9859 Van Lierde ||  || Edmond Van Lierde (1888–1964), a brilliant student at the University of Brussels, later professor of mathematics, promoted modern mathematics and introduced this new discipline into Belgium. He was also a splendid pianist and an excellent tennis player. || 
|-id=860
| 9860 Archaeopteryx ||  || Archaeopteryx, the early bird that had a dinosaur-like skeleton. || 
|-id=861
| 9861 Jahreiss ||  || Hartmut Jahreiß (born 1942), a staff astronomer at the Astronomisches Rechen-Institut. || 
|-id=863
| 9863 Reichardt ||  || Johann Friedrich Reichardt, German composer || 
|-id=865
| 9865 Akiraohta ||  || Akira Ohta (1951–2002), an amateur observer of meteors and comets. || 
|-id=866
| 9866 Kanaimitsuo ||  || Mitsuo Kanai (born 1946), a lecturer and curator at the Gotoh Planetarium and Astronomical Museum in Tokyo for 15 years.  || 
|-id=869
| 9869 Yadoumaru ||  || Yasushi Yadoumaru (born 1965), a research fellow at the Misato Observatory. || 
|-id=870
| 9870 Maehata || 1992 DA || Hideko Maehata (née Hideco Hyodo, 1914–1995), born in Hashimoto city, Wakayama Prefecture, won the gold medal for the 200-m breast-stroke event in the 1936 Olympic Games in Berlin. She was the first Japanese female Olympic gold medalist. || 
|-id=871
| 9871 Jeon ||  || Jeon San-Woon (born 1928), a historian of Korean astronomy and technology. || 
|-id=872
| 9872 Solf ||  || Josef K. M. Solf (born 1934), professor of astronomy at Heidelberg and Jena, and since 1994 director of the Thüringer Landessternwarte Tautenburg. || 
|-id=873
| 9873 Freundlich || 1992 GH || Erwin Finlay-Freundlich (1885–1964) was a German astronomer at Berlin Observatory and later professor at St. Andrews University in Scotland, who designed the Einstein Tower solar telescope at Potsdam, which was built to support experiments and observations to validate Albert Einstein's relativity theory. || 
|-id=878
| 9878 Sostero || 1994 FQ || Giovanni Sostero, Italian aerospace engineer and amateur astronomer† || 
|-id=879
| 9879 Mammuthus ||  || Mammuthus or woolly mammoth was a kind of elephant, about 4 meters tall, with dense dark hair and an 8-cm-thick layer of fat, protecting the animal from the cold. || 
|-id=880
| 9880 Stegosaurus ||  || Stegosaurus, a large dinosaur, 6 to 9 meters long, with a characteristic double row of large bony plates along the back. || 
|-id=881
| 9881 Sampson || 1994 SE || Ralph Allen Sampson (1866–1939) was an Irish-British astronomer and 5th Astronomer Royal for Scotland, whose research included the color temperature of stars and the theory of the motions of the four Galilean moons. The lunar crater Sampson is named after him. || 
|-id=882
| 9882 Stallman ||  || Richard Stallman (born 1953), the founder of the GNU Project and an advocate and developer of free software. || 
|-id=883
| 9883 Veecas ||  || The Ventura County Astronomical Society (VCAS) on the occasion of their 50th anniversary. The discoverer of this minor planet, John E. Rogers at Camarillo Observatory , is a co-founder of VCAS (Src). || 
|-id=884
| 9884 Příbram ||  || Príbram, the town in central Bohemia, was the impact site, on 7 April 1959, of the first photographic detection of a meteorite fall. Analysis of the fireball trajectory by Z. Ceplecha led to the discovery of four meteorites. || 
|-id=885
| 9885 Linux ||  || The Linux kernel was created by Linus Torvalds in 1991. || 
|-id=886
| 9886 Aoyagi ||  || Fusao Aoyagi (born 1952), the president of astronomical society in the town of Ishikawa, Fukushima prefecture. || 
|-id=887
| 9887 Ashikaga || 1995 AH || The city of Ashikaga in the south of Tochigi prefecture is the birthplace of the discoverer. The city has been well known for its textiles since ancient times. || 
|-id=891
| 9891 Stephensmith ||  || Stephen Smith, American publisher of The Shallow Sky Bulletin from 1986 to 2000; the SSB contained cometary ephemerides. || 
|-id=892
| 9892 Meigetsuki ||  || Meigetsuki (明月記; The Record of the Clear Moon) a diary written by Japanese poet Fujiwara no Teika (1162–1241), containing astronomical events, such as SN 1054, a supernova explosion from which the Crab Nebula formed. || 
|-id=893
| 9893 Sagano ||  || The Sagano district is located in the western part of Kyoto, Japan. It is one of the city's most popular area for sightseeing, known for its bamboo forest and Zen temples. The historic place has been visited by imperial family, aristocrats, and the literati since the 9th century. || 
|-id=897
| 9897 Malerba ||  || Franco Malerba (born 1946), the first Italian astronaut. || 
|-id=898
| 9898 Yoshiro || 1996 DF || Yoshiro Yamada (born 1954), a leading popularizer of astronomy in Japan. He worked at the National Astronomical Observatory as a public outreach official, and also at museums in Sagamihara, Yokohama and Tokyo. He translated Don Yeomans' book on near-earth objects into Japanese. || 
|-id=899
| 9899 Greaves || 1996 EH || William Michael Herbert Greaves (1897–1955) was a British astronomer and 6th Astronomer Royal for Scotland known for his work on stellar spectrophotometry and advocacy for the proposed Jodrell Bank Observatory. The lunar crater Greaves is named after him. || 
|-id=900
| 9900 Llull ||  || Ramon Llull (1232–1316), a Catalan writer, philosopher, mystic, missionary and man of science, born in Mallorca. Among his more than 265 works and treatises, his Tractatus novus de astronomia, written in Paris around 1297, adheres to the ideas of Ptolemy. || 
|}

9901–10000 

|-id=902
| 9902 Kirkpatrick || 1997 NY || Ralph Kirkpatrick (1911–1984), eminent American harpsichordist, clavichordist, musicologist and teacher. || 
|-id=903
| 9903 Leonhardt ||  || Gustav Leonhardt (1928–2012), Dutch clavecinist, organist and musicologist. || 
|-id=904
| 9904 Mauratombelli ||  || Maura Tombelli (born 1952), Italian astronomer and discoverer of minor planets || 
|-id=905
| 9905 Tiziano || 4611 P-L || Tiziano Vecellio (Titian; c. 1477 or 1490–1576), a typical Renaissance painter. || 
|-id=906
| 9906 Tintoretto || 6523 P-L || Jacopo Robusti (1518–1594), called Tintoretto, Italian (Venetian) painter. || 
|-id=907
| 9907 Oileus || 6541 P-L || Oileus, the father of Ajax the Little. Next to Achilles, Ajax was the fastest-running Greek hero. || 
|-id=908
| 9908 Aue || 2140 T-1 || Hartmann von Aue (born c. 1160–70, died c. 1210–20), a German poet and knight || 
|-id=909
| 9909 Eschenbach || 4355 T-1 || Wolfram von Eschenbach (1168–1220) was, with von Aue and Gottfried von Strassburg, one of the greatest poets of medieval times. || 
|-id=910
| 9910 Vogelweide || 3181 T-2 || Walther von der Vogelweide (c. 1170–1230), a German lyric poet. || 
|-id=911
| 9911 Quantz || 4129 T-2 || Johann Joachim Quantz (1697–1773), a German flutist and composer. || 
|-id=912
| 9912 Donizetti || 2078 T-3 || Gaetano Donizetti (1797–1848), Italian composer. || 
|-id=913
| 9913 Humperdinck || 4071 T-3 || Engelbert Humperdinck (1854–1921), a German composer. || 
|-id=914
| 9914 Obukhova ||  || Nadezhda Andreevna Obukhova (1886–1961), a Russian singer. || 
|-id=915
| 9915 Potanin ||  || Grigorij Nikolaevich Potanin (1835–1920), a Russian geographer, ethnographer and publicist. || 
|-id=916
| 9916 Kibirev ||  || Sergej Feodosievich Kibirev (born 1950) is involved in new methods of the processing of information, organizing the production of microelectronics in Novosibirsk. A champion sprinter in his youth, he likes extreme forms of sports. He is also a poet. || 
|-id=917
| 9917 Keynes || 1979 MK || John Maynard Keynes (1883–1946), a British economist whose ideas fundamentally changed the theory and practice of macroeconomics and the economic policies of governments || 
|-id=918
| 9918 Timtrenkle ||  || Timothy G. Trenkle (born 1958) is a contributor to the Lucy mission, leading the "Engineering Technology Directorate" at Goddard Space Flight Center. || 
|-id=919
| 9919 Undset ||  || Sigrid Undset (1882–1949), a Norwegian author. || 
|-id=920
| 9920 Bagnulo ||  || Stefano Bagnulo (born 1965), an astronomer at the Armagh Observatory and a specialist in polarimetry of early-type stars. || 
|-id=921
| 9921 Rubincam ||  || David P. Rubincam (born 1947), an American planetary geodynamicist at the NASA Goddard Space Flight Center. || 
|-id=922
| 9922 Catcheller ||  || Endowing the English language with a new term, the 1961 novel Catch-22 by U.S. writer Joseph Heller (1923–1999) epitomized both the problems of a sane person in an insane society and the absurdity of war. The name was suggested by B. G. Marsden. || 
|-id=923
| 9923 Ronaldthiel ||  || Ronald L. Thiel (born 1937) is the Division Chief of the Traffic Division for the County of Hawaii. In his capacity as traffic engineer, he has overseen the installation of shielded LED streetlights and other lighting that is designed to minimize impact on the dark night sky over the Mauna Kea Observatories. || 
|-id=924
| 9924 Corrigan ||  || Catherine Corrigan (born 1972) is a U.S. meteoriticist at the Smithsonian Institution. Her research includes the mineralogy and origin of asteroids. She classifies and provides access to meteorites from the U.S. Antarctic collection for the international research community. || 
|-id=925
| 9925 Juliehoskin ||  || Candace Julie Hoskin (born 1974) is the Collection Manager for meteorites at the Smithsonian Institution. She is responsible for maintaining the collection and providing access to samples for researchers studying the origin and evolution of asteroids. || 
|-id=926
| 9926 Desch ||  || Steven Desch (born 1970) is a professor of astronomy at Arizona State University. His work in theoretical astrophysics centers on models of the origin and evolution of asteroids and planets, including chondrule formation, protoplanetary disk evolution, and the origin of short-lived radionuclides. Nier Prize awardee in 2003. || 
|-id=927
| 9927 Tyutchev ||  || Fyodor Tyutchev (1803–1873), Russian poet || 
|-id=929
| 9929 McConnell ||  || John C McConnell (born 1946), a historian of Astronomy and chairman of the East Antrim Astronomical Society || 
|-id=930
| 9930 Billburrows || 1984 CP || William E. Burrows (born 1937), of New York University, is a top authority on space, national security, spy satellites and spy planes. || 
|-id=931
| 9931 Herbhauptman || 1985 HH || Herbert A. Hauptman (1917–2011), mathematical chemist and Nobelist. || 
|-id=932
| 9932 Kopylov ||  || Ivan Mikheevich Kopylov (born 1928), Russian astronomer. || 
|-id=933
| 9933 Alekseev ||  || Anatolij Semenovich Alekseev (born 1928), a professor in the department of mathematical geophysics at Novosibirsk University. || 
|-id=934
| 9934 Caccioppoli || 1985 UC || Renato Caccioppoli (1904–1959) and Francesco Caccioppoli (1855–1904). Francesco directed the Naval Institute in Procida, near Napoli, and was a passionate observer of the sky. Renato was an outstanding mathematician who carried out seminal work on linear and nonlinear differential equations. The name was suggested by E. Perozzi. || 
|-id=936
| 9936 Al-Biruni ||  || Al-Biruni (973–1050), a Persian anthropologist, mathematician, and astronomer || 
|-id=937
| 9937 Triceratops ||  || Triceratops, dinosaur genus. || 
|-id=938
| 9938 Kretlow || 1988 KA || Mike Kretlow, a longtime friend of the discoverer. || 
|-id=941
| 9941 Iguanodon ||  || Iguanodon, dinosaur genus. || 
|-id=943
| 9943 Bizan ||  || Mount Bizan is a 277-m-high mountain in Tokushima Prefecture. The name is said to be derived from the mountain's visual similarity to an eyebrow || 
|-id=945
| 9945 Karinaxavier || 1990 KX || Karina Xavier (born 1977) is a citizen of both Brazil and the U.S. but might have chosen to be born in Italy had she been asked; instead she obtained her doctorate in Italian Renaissance literature. A true citizen of the world, she speaks five languages fluently, often all at once, and has a passion for soccer || 
|-id=947
| 9947 Takaishuji || 1990 QB || Shuji Takai (born 1967), a Japanese elementary school teacher and member of the Kuroishi Subaru Association. || 
|-id=949
| 9949 Brontosaurus ||  || Brontosaurus, a genus of a large dinosaur (20 m), that lived in the Late Jurassic with many fossils found in the United States. || 
|-id=950
| 9950 ESA || 1990 VB || European Space Agency || 
|-id=951
| 9951 Tyrannosaurus ||  || Tyrannosaurus, dinosaur genus. || 
|-id=954
| 9954 Brachiosaurus ||  || Brachiosaurus, dinosaur genus. || 
|-id=956
| 9956 Castellaz ||  || Peter Castellaz (born 1965), a German physicist. || 
|-id=957
| 9957 Raffaellosanti ||  || Raphael (1483–1520), full name Raffaello Sanzio, a famous painter and architect, and one of the masters of the Italian Renaissance. || 
|-id=960
| 9960 Sekine ||  || Masumi Sekine (born 1950), the president of astronomical society at Ageo city. || 
|-id=962
| 9962 Pfau ||  || Werner Pfau (born 1936), director of the Jena University Observatory from 1990 to 2000 and a former chairman of the Astronomische Gesellschaft. || 
|-id=963
| 9963 Sandage || 1992 AN || Allan Sandage (1926–2010), an American astronomer at Palomar and Mount Wilson observatories. || 
|-id=964
| 9964 Hideyonoguchi ||  || Hideo Noguchi (1876–1928), a Japanese bacteriologist || 
|-id=965
| 9965 GNU ||  || The GNU Project was created by Richard Stallman's Free Software Foundation in 1984. It enabled computer programmers to trade and improve on each other's ideas freely. Linux and academic computing owe much of their functionality to the firm foundations of GNU software. || 
|-id=967
| 9967 Awanoyumi ||  || Yumi Awano (born 1972), the curator of the Okayama Astronomical Museum. || 
|-id=968
| 9968 Serpe ||  || Jean Nicolas François Jules Serpe (1914–2001) was the theoretical-physics professor of the discoverer at the University of Liege and was a member of the Académie royale de Belgique || 
|-id=969
| 9969 Braille || 1992 KD || Louis Braille (1809–1852), French cellist and organist, inventor of braille. || 
|-id=971
| 9971 Ishihara || 1993 HS || Takahiro Ishihara (born 1961), president of the Hiroshima Astronomical Society from 1987 to 1997. || 
|-id=972
| 9972 Minoruoda || 1993 KQ || Minoru Oda (1923–2001), a cosmic-ray physicist. || 
|-id=973
| 9973 Szpilman ||  || Wladyslaw Szpilman (1912–2000), a Polish pianist who managed to survive in the Warsaw ghetto. || 
|-id=974
| 9974 Brody ||  || Adrien Brody, American actor who played Szpilman in the film The Pianist. || 
|-id=975
| 9975 Takimotokoso ||  || Koso Takimoto (born 1965), a Japanese amateur astronomer. || 
|-id=977
| 9977 Kentakunimoto || 1994 AH || Kenta Kunimoto (born 1960), a Japanese neurosurgeon and a specialist in emergency medicine. || 
|-id=981
| 9981 Kudo ||  || Takahiro Kudo (born 1961), a Japanese amateur astronomer and a key member of the Ota Astronomical Club. || 
|-id=983
| 9983 Rickfienberg || 1995 DA || Rick Fienberg (born 1956), American editor-in-chief of Sky and Telescope. || 
|-id=984
| 9984 Gregbryant || 1996 HT || Greg Bryant (born 1970), Australian amateur astronomer.Src || 
|-id=985
| 9985 Akiko || 1996 JF || Akiko Yamamoto (born 1963), Japanese amateur astronomer at the Yatsuka Observatory  || 
|-id=986
| 9986 Hirokun || 1996 NX || Hiroshi Fukazawa, nicknamed Hirokun, fiancé of Mizuho Urata (1972–2004), daughter of the co-discoverer, Takeshi Urata || 
|-id=987
| 9987 Peano ||  || Giuseppe Peano (1858–1932), Italian mathematician || 
|-id=988
| 9988 Erictemplebell ||  || Eric Temple Bell (1883–1960), Scottish-American mathematician and author || 
|-id=990
| 9990 Niiyaeki ||  || Niiya Station (Niiya Eki) is the name of a train station in Ozu, Ehime (population 46,000), a city in Ehime Prefecture, Japan || 
|-id=991
| 9991 Anežka ||  || Anežka Moravcová (born 1924), grandmother of Czech discoverer Zdeněk Moravec || 
|-id=993
| 9993 Kumamoto ||  || Kumamoto, the name of both a prefecture and its capital city, on the Japanese island of Kyushu. || 
|-id=994
| 9994 Grotius || 4028 P-L || Hugo Grotius (1583–1645), Dutch jurist and statesman. || 
|-id=995
| 9995 Alouette || 4805 P-L || Alouette 1, Canadian science satellite launched in 1962 || 
|-id=996
| 9996 ANS || 9070 P-L || Astronomische Nederlandse Satelliet, Dutch science satellite. || 
|-id=997
| 9997 COBE || 1217 T-1 || Cosmic Background Explorer (COBE), science satellite || 
|-id=998
| 9998 ISO || 1293 T-1 || Infrared Space Observatory. || 
|-id=999
| 9999 Wiles || 4196 T-2 || Andrew Wiles (born 1953), British mathematician || 
|-id=000
| 10000 Myriostos || 1951 SY || Greek word for ten-thousandth || 
|}

References 

009001-010000